= Gdynia =

City in Pomeranian Voivodeship, Poland

Gdynia Gdiniô (Kashubian)
- City county
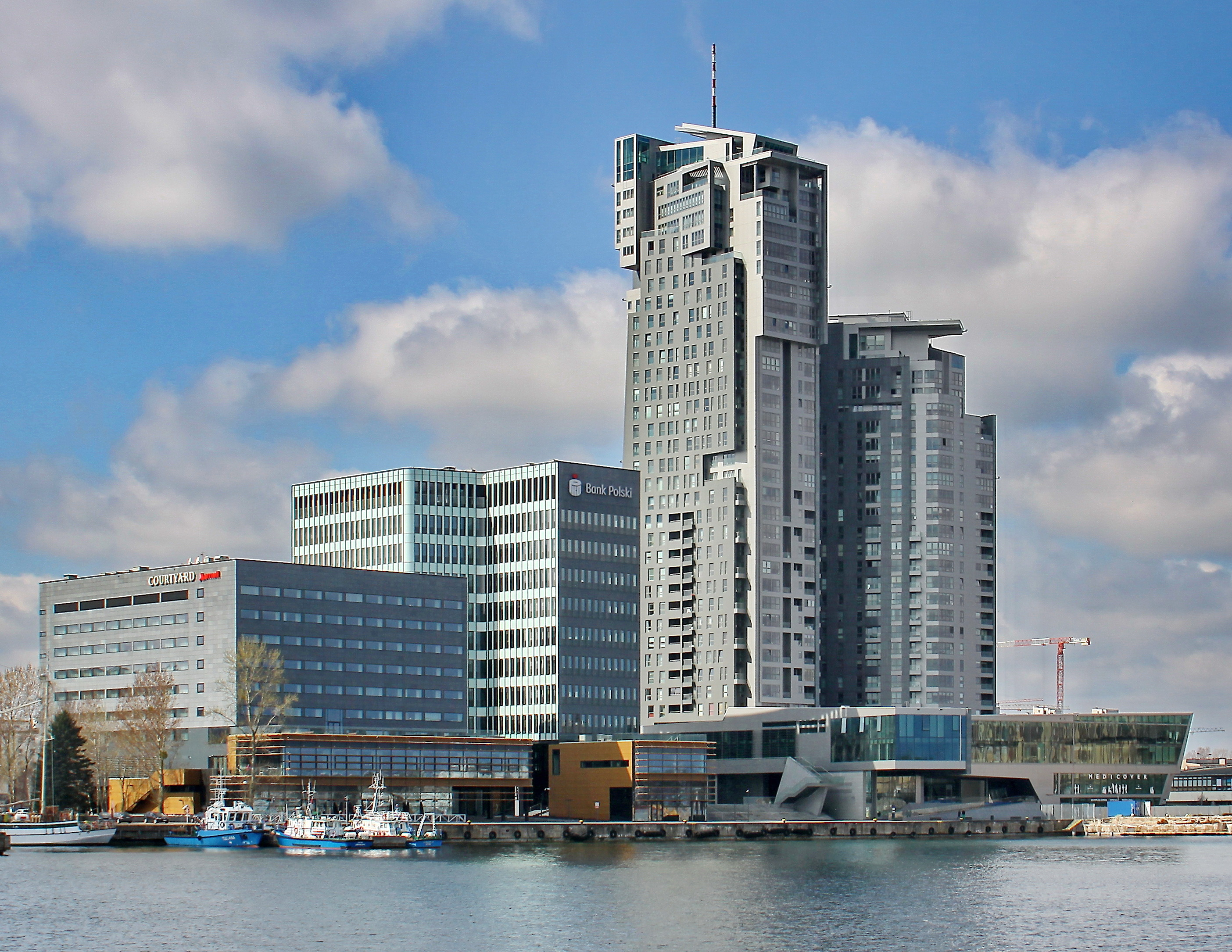
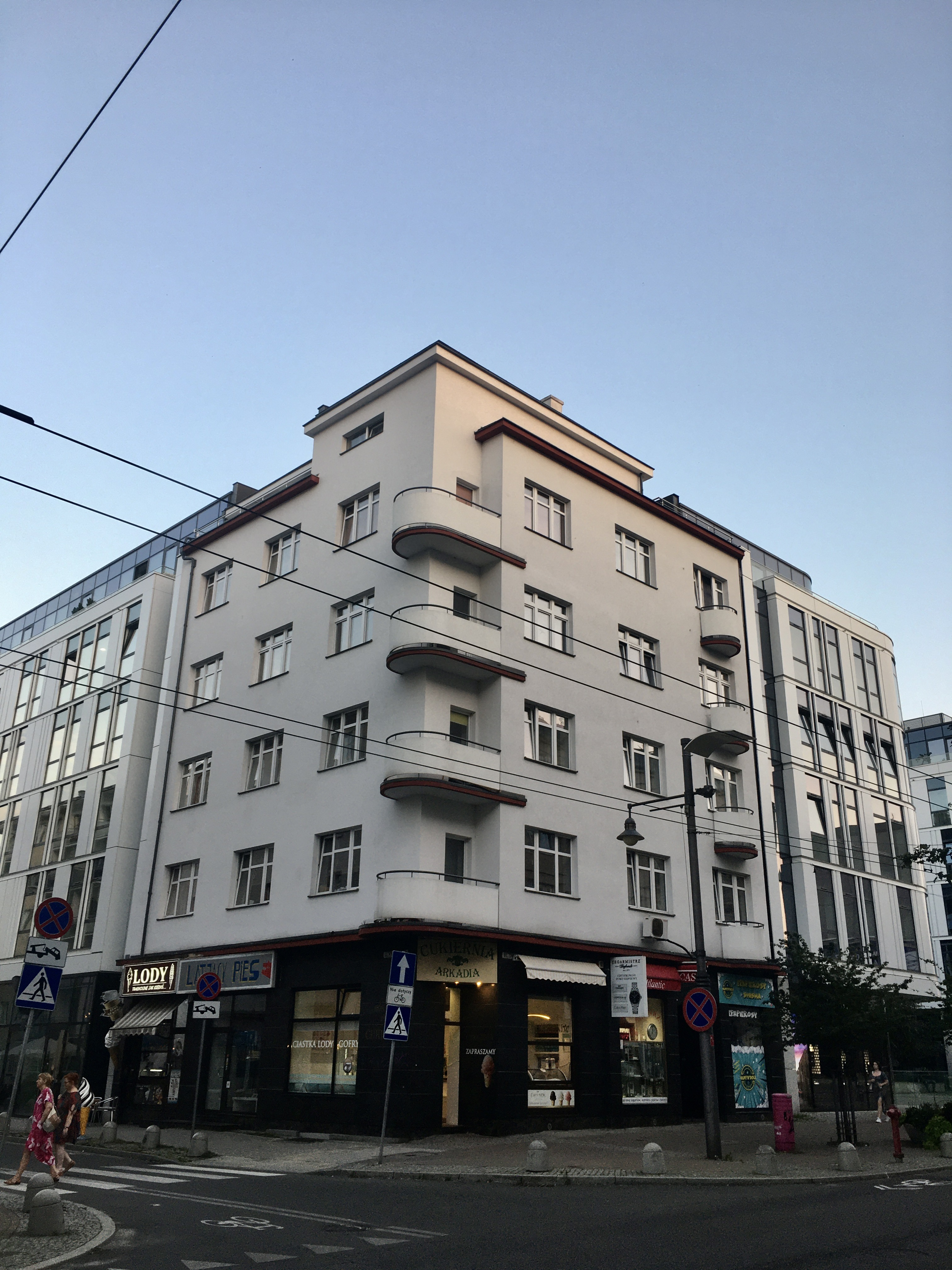
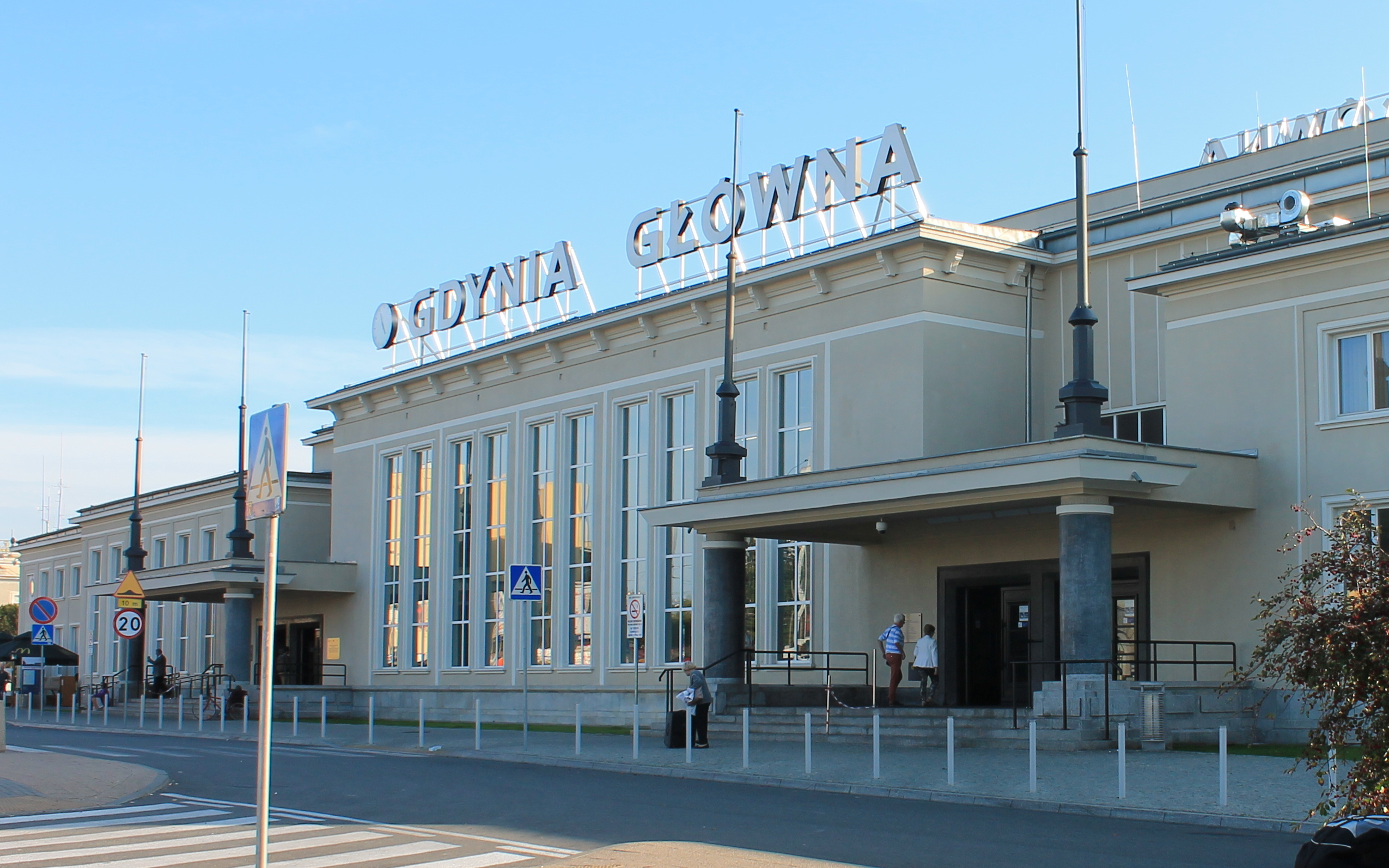
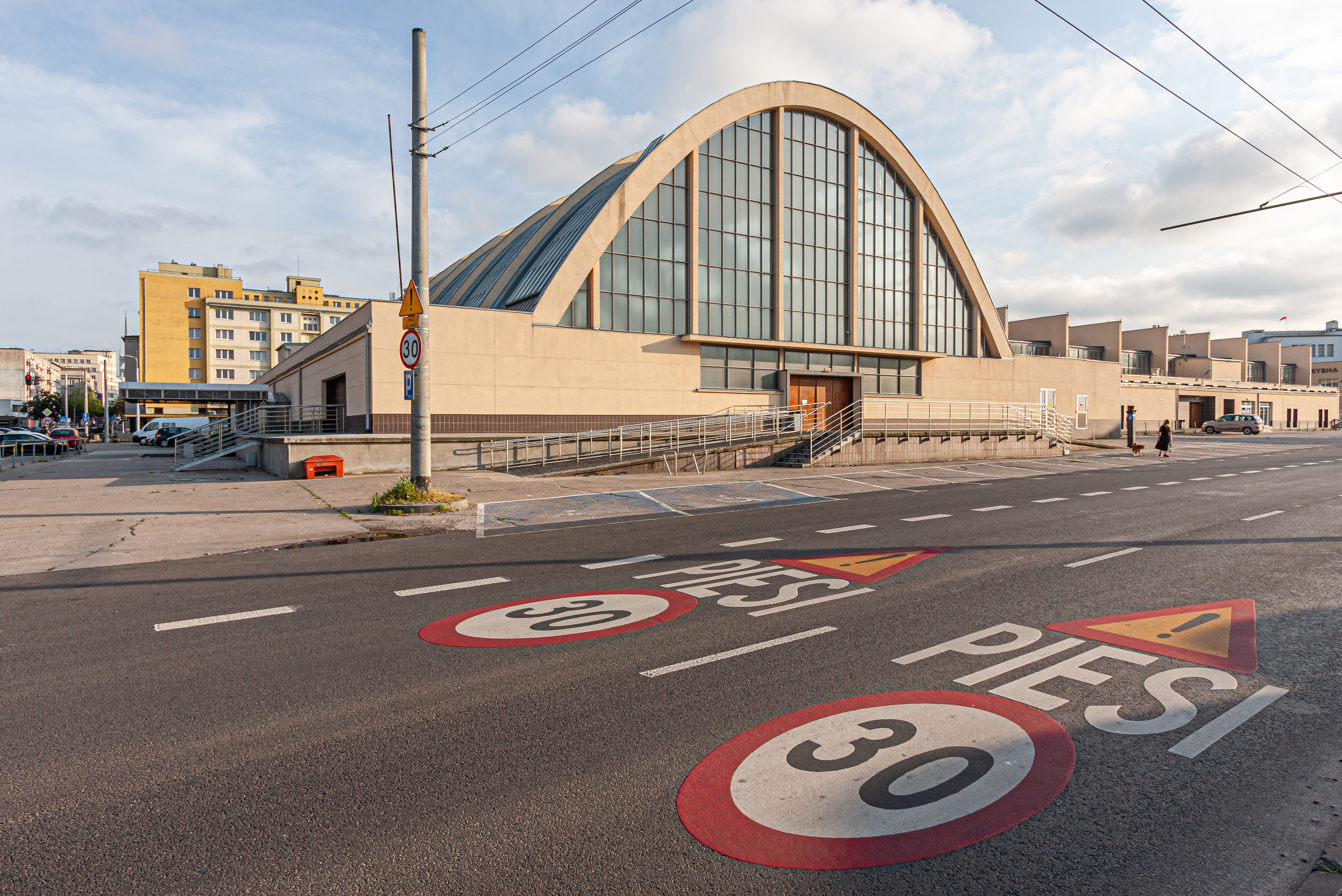
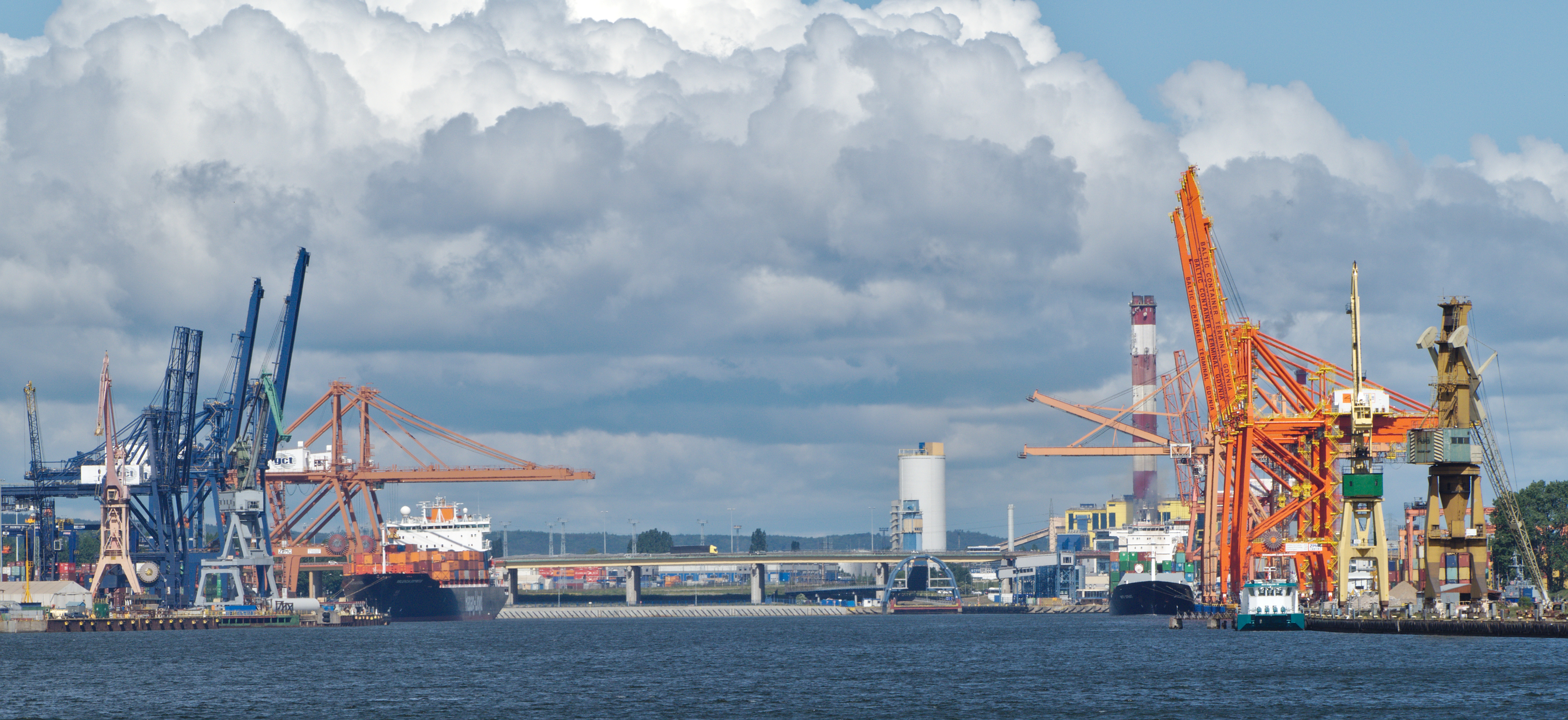
- Sea Towers Świętojańska St. Main railway station City Market Hall Port of Gdynia

- Flag Coat of arms Brandmark
- Motto(s): Miasto z morza i marzeń ("The city of sea and dreams")
- Location within Poland
- Coordinates: 54°31′03″N 18°32′24″E
- Country: Poland
- Voivodeship: Pomeranian
- County: city county
- City rights: 10 February 1926
- Boroughs: 21 districts

Government
  - Mayor: Aleksandra Kosiorek

Area
  - City county: 391.5 km^{2} (151.2 sq mi)
  - Land: 130.8 km^{2} (50.5 sq mi)
- Highest elevation: 205 m (673 ft)
- Lowest elevation: 0 m (0 ft)

Population (30 June 2025)
  - City county: 239,325 ▼ (12th)
  - Density: 1,830/km^{2} (4,700/sq mi)
  - Metro: 1,080,700
- Demonym(s): Gdynianin (male); Gdynianka (female) (pl)
- Time zone: UTC+1 (CET)
  - Summer (DST): UTC+2 (CEST)
- Postal code: 81-004 to 81-919
- Area code: +48 58
- Car plates: GA, XA
- International airport: Gdańsk (GDN)
- Website: http://www.gdynia.pl

UNESCO World Heritage Site
- Official name: Gdynia Modernist City Centre
- Type: Cultural
- Criteria: IV
- Designated: 2026
- Reference no.: 1715
- UNESCO region: Europe

Gdynia (Note: Polish: [ˈɡdɨɲa]; Kashubian: Gdiniô; German: Gdingen, pronounced [ˈɡdɪŋən] or [ɡəˈdɪŋən]) is a city in northern Poland and a seaport on the Baltic Sea coast. With a population of c. 239,000, it is the 12th-largest city in Poland and the second-largest in the Pomeranian Voivodeship after Gdańsk. Gdynia is part of a conurbation with the spa town of Sopot, the city of Gdańsk, and suburban communities, which together form a metropolitan area called the Tricity (Trójmiasto) with around one million inhabitants. Gdynia is the largest city in Poland not to be a voivodeship capital.

Historically and culturally part of Kashubia and Eastern Pomerania, Gdynia for centuries remained a small fishing village. By the 20th-century it attracted visitors as a seaside resort town. In 1926, Gdynia was granted city rights after which it enjoyed demographic and urban development, with a modernist cityscape. It became a major seaport city of Poland. In 1970, protests in and around Gdynia contributed to the rise of the Solidarity movement in nearby Gdańsk.

The port of Gdynia is a regular stopover on the cruising itinerary of luxury passenger ships and ferries travelling to Scandinavia. Gdynia's downtown, designated a historical monument of Poland and inscribed on the UNESCO World Heritage List, is an example of building an integrated European community and includes Functionalist architectural forms. The city is also known for holding the annual Gdynia Film Festival. In 2013, Gdynia was ranked by readers of The News as Poland's best city to live in, and topped the national rankings in the category of "general quality of life". In 2021, the city entered the UNESCO Creative Cities Network and was named UNESCO City of Film.

== History ==
=== Early history ===
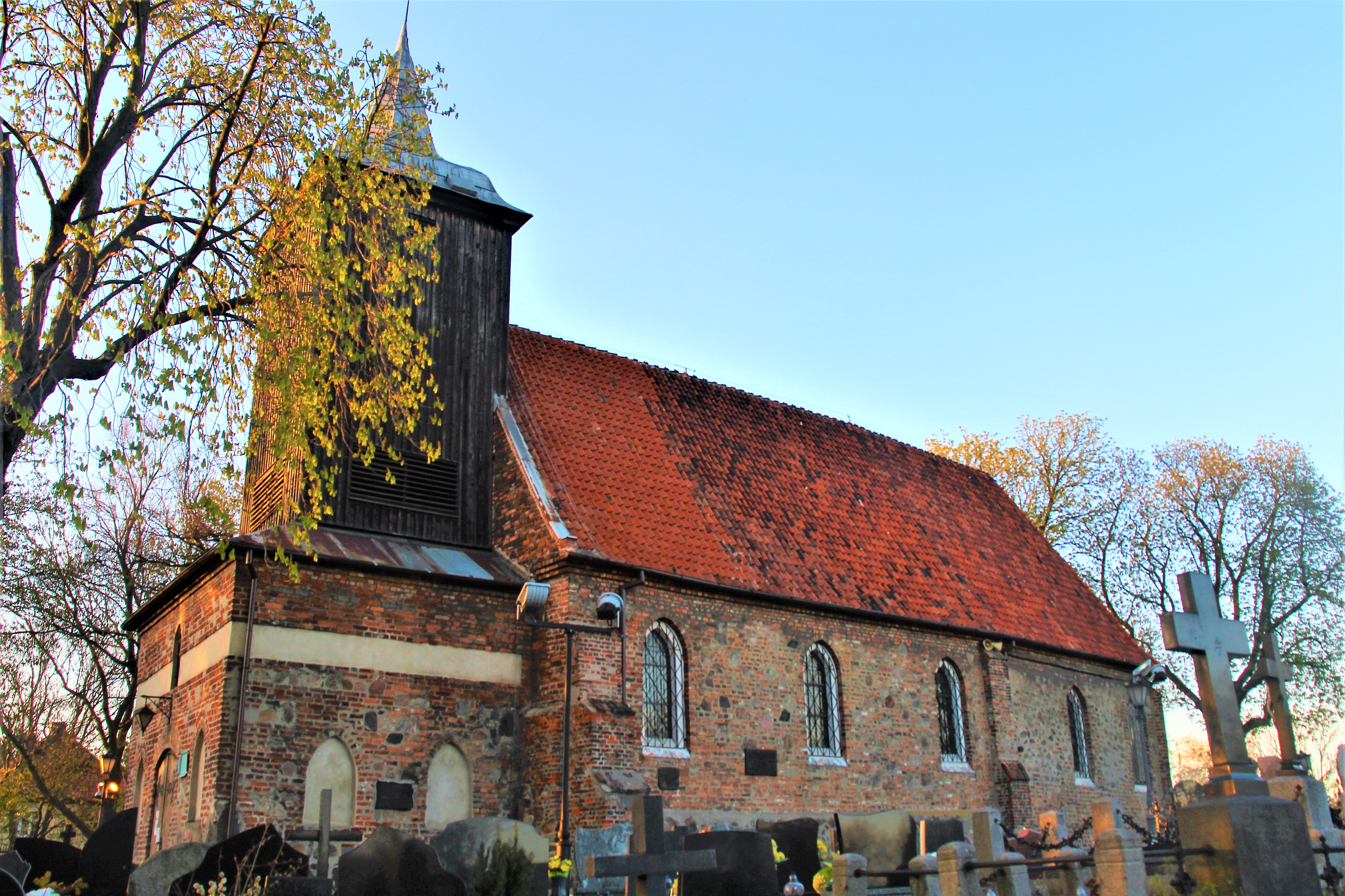
Medieval St. Michael Archangel Church is the oldest building in Gdynia

The area of the later city of Gdynia shared its history with Pomerelia (Eastern Pomerania). In prehistoric times, it was the centre of Oksywie culture; it was later populated by Lechites with minor Baltic Prussian influences. In the late 10th century, the region was united with the emerging state of Poland by its first historic ruler Mieszko I. During the reign of Bolesław II, the region seceded from Poland and became independent, to be reunited with Poland in 1116/1121 by Bolesław III. In 1209, the present-day district of Oksywie was first mentioned (as Oxhöft).

Following the fragmentation of Poland, the region became part of the Duchy of Pomerania (Farther Pomerania), which became separate from Poland in 1227, to be reunited in 1282. The first known mention of the name "Gdynia", as a Pomeranian (Kashubian) fishing village dates back to 1253. The first church on this part of the Baltic Sea coast was built there. In 1309–1310, the Teutonic Order invaded and annexed the region from Poland. In 1380, the owner of the village which became Gdynia, Peter from Rusocin, gave the village to the Cistercian Order. In 1382, Gdynia became property of the Cistercian abbey in Oliwa.

In 1454, King Casimir IV Jagiellon signed the act of reincorporation of the region to the Kingdom of Poland, and the Thirteen Years' War, the longest of all Polish-Teutonic wars, started. It ended in 1466, when the Teutonic Knights recognized the region as part of Poland. Administratively, Gdynia was located in the Pomeranian Voivodeship in the province of Royal Prussia in the Greater Poland Province of the Kingdom of Poland and later of the Polish–Lithuanian Commonwealth. The present-day neighbourhood of Kolibki was the location of the Kolibki estate, purchased by King John III Sobieski in 1685.

In 1772, Gdynia was annexed by the Kingdom of Prussia in the First Partition of Poland. Gdynia, under the Germanized name Gdingen, was included within the newly formed province of West Prussia and was expropriated from the Cistercian Order. In 1789, there were only 21 houses in Gdynia. Around that time Gdynia was so small that it was not marked on many maps of the period: it was about halfway from Oksywie and Mały Kack, now districts of Gdynia. In 1871, the village became part of the German Empire. In the early 20th century Gdynia was not a poor fishing village as it is sometimes described; it had become a popular tourist spot with several guest houses, restaurants, cafés, several brick houses and a small harbour with a pier for small trading ships. The first Kashubian mayor was Jan Radtke. It is estimated that around 1910 the population of Gdynia was 895 people.

Following World War I, in 1918, Poland regained independence, and following the Treaty of Versailles, in 1920, Gdynia was re-integrated with the reborn Polish state. Simultaneously, the nearby city of Gdańsk (Danzig) and surrounding area was declared a free city and put under the League of Nations, though Poland was given economic liberties and requisitioned for matters of foreign representation.

=== Construction of the seaport ===
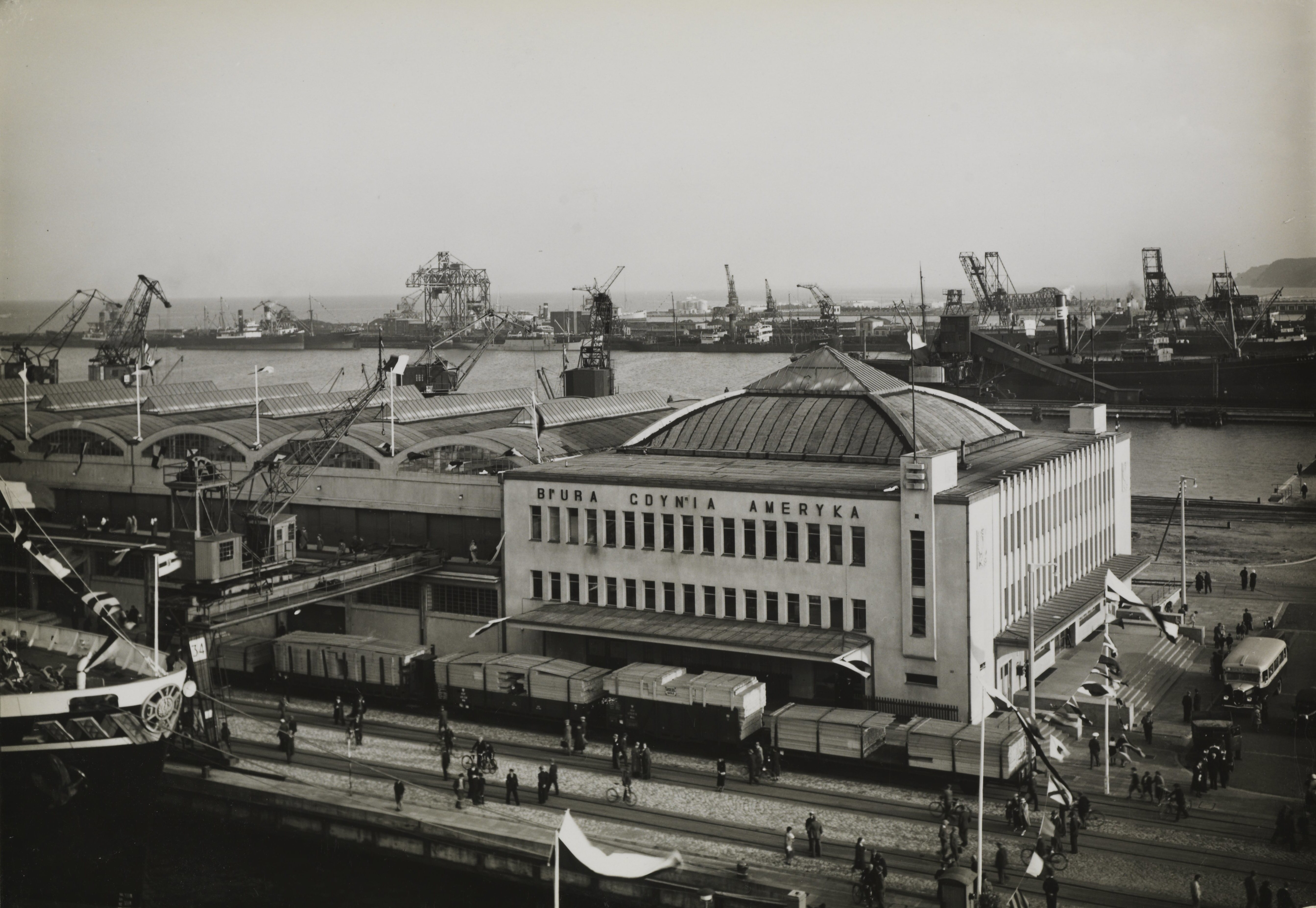
Gdynia Seaport in 1935

The decision to build a major seaport at Gdynia village was made by the Polish government in winter 1920, in the midst of the Polish–Soviet War (1919–1921). The authorities and seaport workers of the Free City of Danzig felt Poland's economic rights in the city were being misappropriated to help fight the war. German dockworkers went on strike, refusing to unload shipments of military supplies sent from the West to aid the Polish army, and Poland realized the need for a port city it was in complete control of, economically and politically.

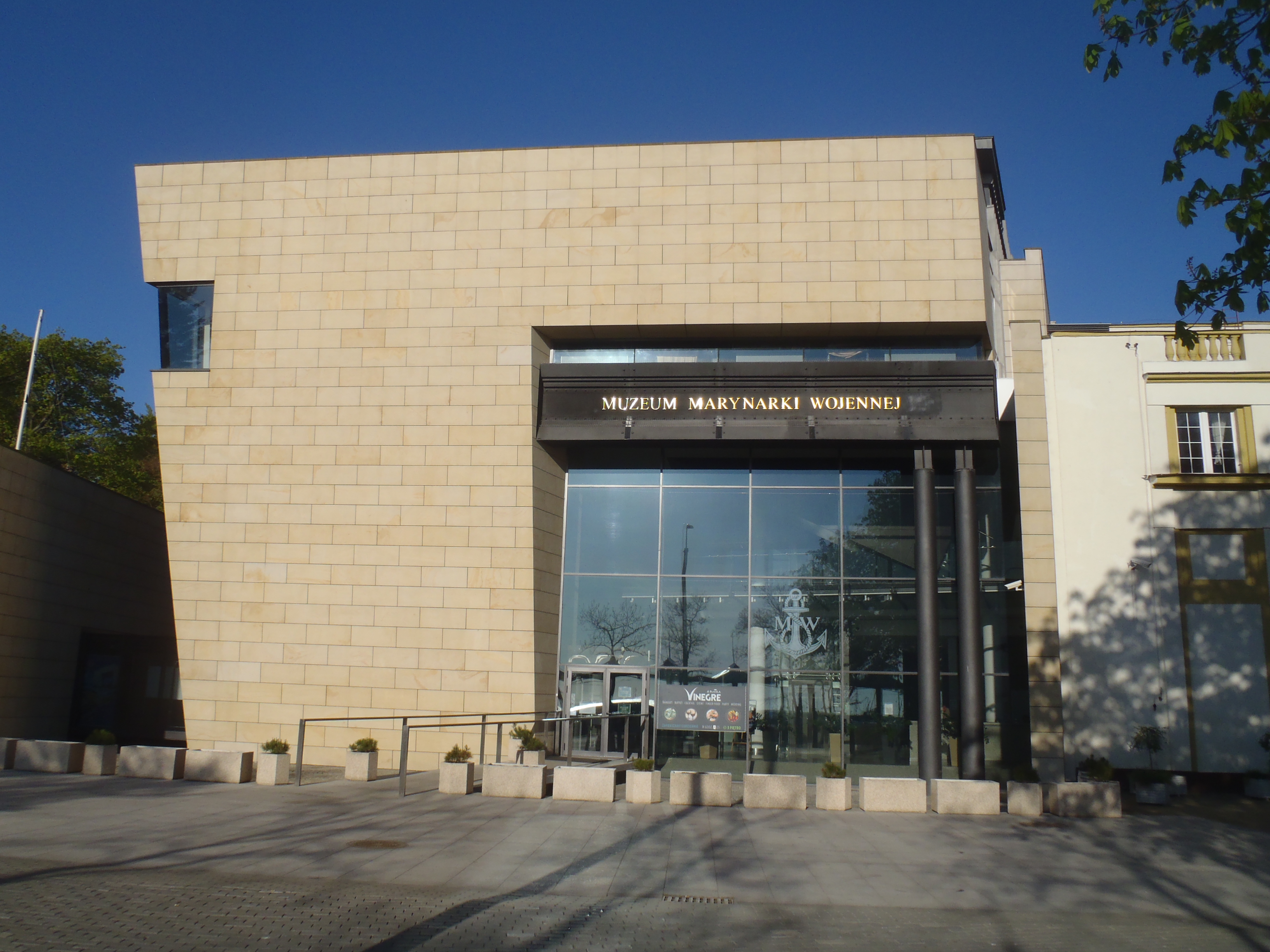
Museum of the Navy in Gdynia

Construction of Gdynia seaport started in 1921 but, because of financial difficulties, it was conducted slowly and with interruptions. It was accelerated after the Sejm (Polish parliament) passed the Gdynia Seaport Construction Act on 23 September 1922. By 1923 a 550-metre pier, 175 metres (574 feet) of a wooden tide breaker, and a small harbour had been constructed. Ceremonial inauguration of Gdynia as a temporary military port and fishers' shelter took place on 23 April 1923. The first major seagoing ship, the French Line steamer Kentucky, arrived on 13 August 1923 after being diverted because of a strike at Gdansk.

Historical population
Year	Pop.	±%
1950	103,458	—
1960	147,625	+42.7%
1970	191,500	+29.7%
1978	227,140	+18.6%
1988	249,805	+10.0%
2002	253,458	+1.5%
2011	249,139	−1.7%
2021	245,222	−1.6%

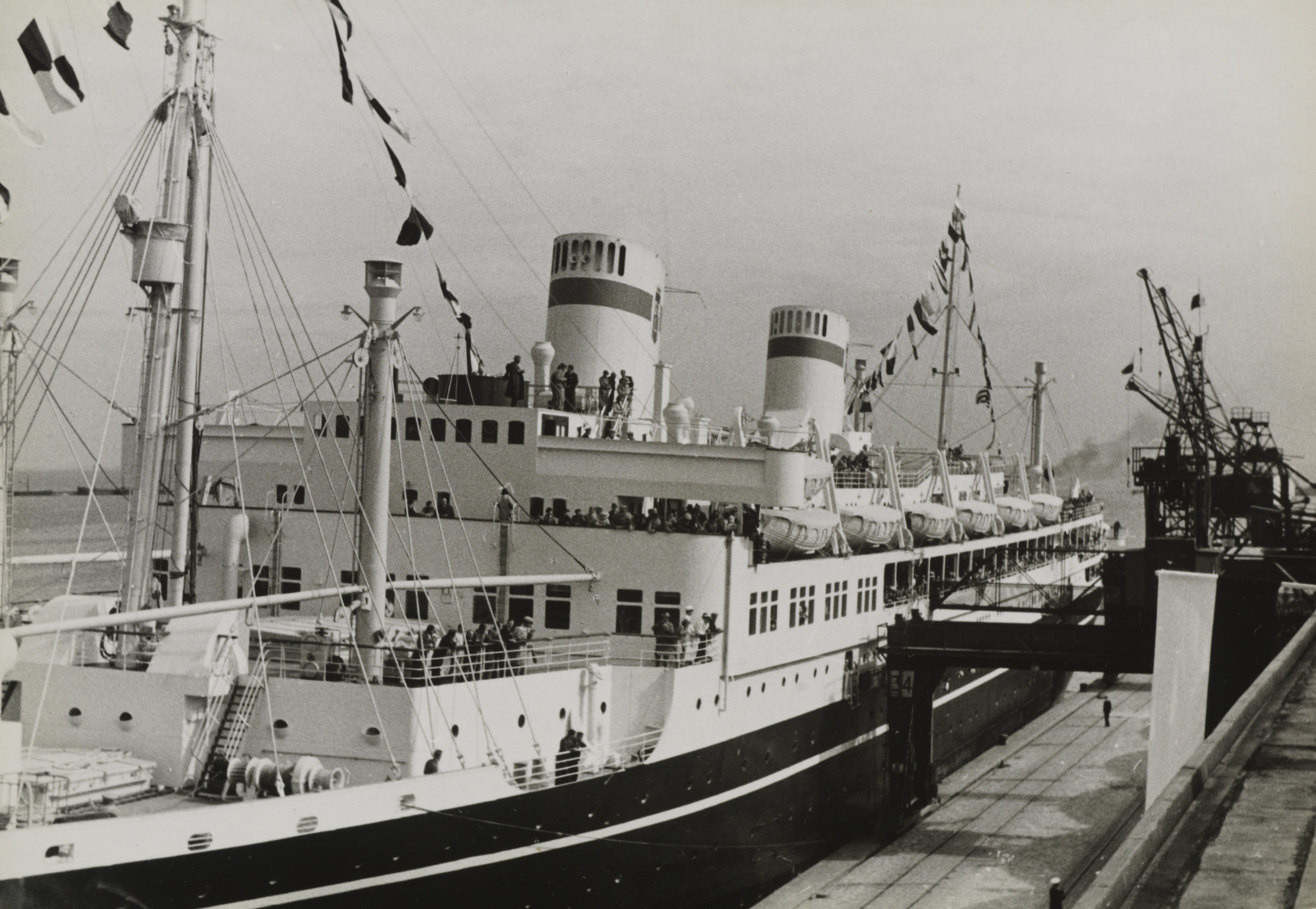
MS Pilsudski in Gdynia, 1935

To speed up the construction works, the Polish government in November 1924 signed a contract with the French-Polish Consortium for Gdynia Seaport Construction. By the end of 1925, they had built a small seven-metre-deep harbour, the south pier, part of the north pier, a railway, and had ordered the trans-shipment equipment. The works were going more slowly than expected, however. They accelerated only after May 1926, because of an increase in Polish exports by sea, economic prosperity, the outbreak of the German–Polish trade war which reverted most Polish international trade to sea routes, and thanks to the personal engagement of Eugeniusz Kwiatkowski, Polish Minister of Industry and Trade (also responsible for the construction of Centralny Okręg Przemysłowy). By the end of 1930 docks, piers, breakwaters, and many auxiliary and industrial installations were constructed (such as depots, trans-shipment equipment, and a rice processing factory) or started (such as a large cold store).

Trans-shipments rose from 10,000 tons (1924) to 2,923,000 tons (1929). At this time Gdynia was the only transit and special seaport designed for coal exports.

In the years 1931–1939 Gdynia harbour was further extended to become a universal seaport. In 1938 Gdynia was the largest and most modern seaport on the Baltic Sea, as well as the tenth biggest in Europe. The trans-shipments rose to 8.7 million tons, which was 46% of Polish foreign trade. In 1938 the Gdynia shipyard started to build its first full-sea ship, the Olza.

=== Construction of the city ===
The city was constructed later than the seaport. In 1925 a special committee was inaugurated to build the city; city expansion plans were designed and city rights were granted in 1926, and tax privileges were granted for investors in 1927. The city started to grow significantly after 1928.

A new railway station and the Post Office were completed. The State railways extended their lines, built bridges and also constructed a group of houses for their employees. Within a few years houses were built along some 10 miles (16 km) of road leading northward from the Free City of Danzig to Gdynia and beyond. Public institutions and private employers helped their staff to build houses.
In 1933 a plan of development providing for a population of 250,000 was worked out by a special commission appointed by a government committee, in collaboration with the municipal authorities. By 1939 the population had grown to over 120,000.

Most of the buildings created in 1929–1939 survived the war which was quite unique for Poland. In July 2026, Gdynia's modernist buildings were inscribed on the list of UNESCO World Heritage Sites. The designated area includes the city centre (Śródmieście) and Kamienna Góra, together with architectural landmarks built before the war.

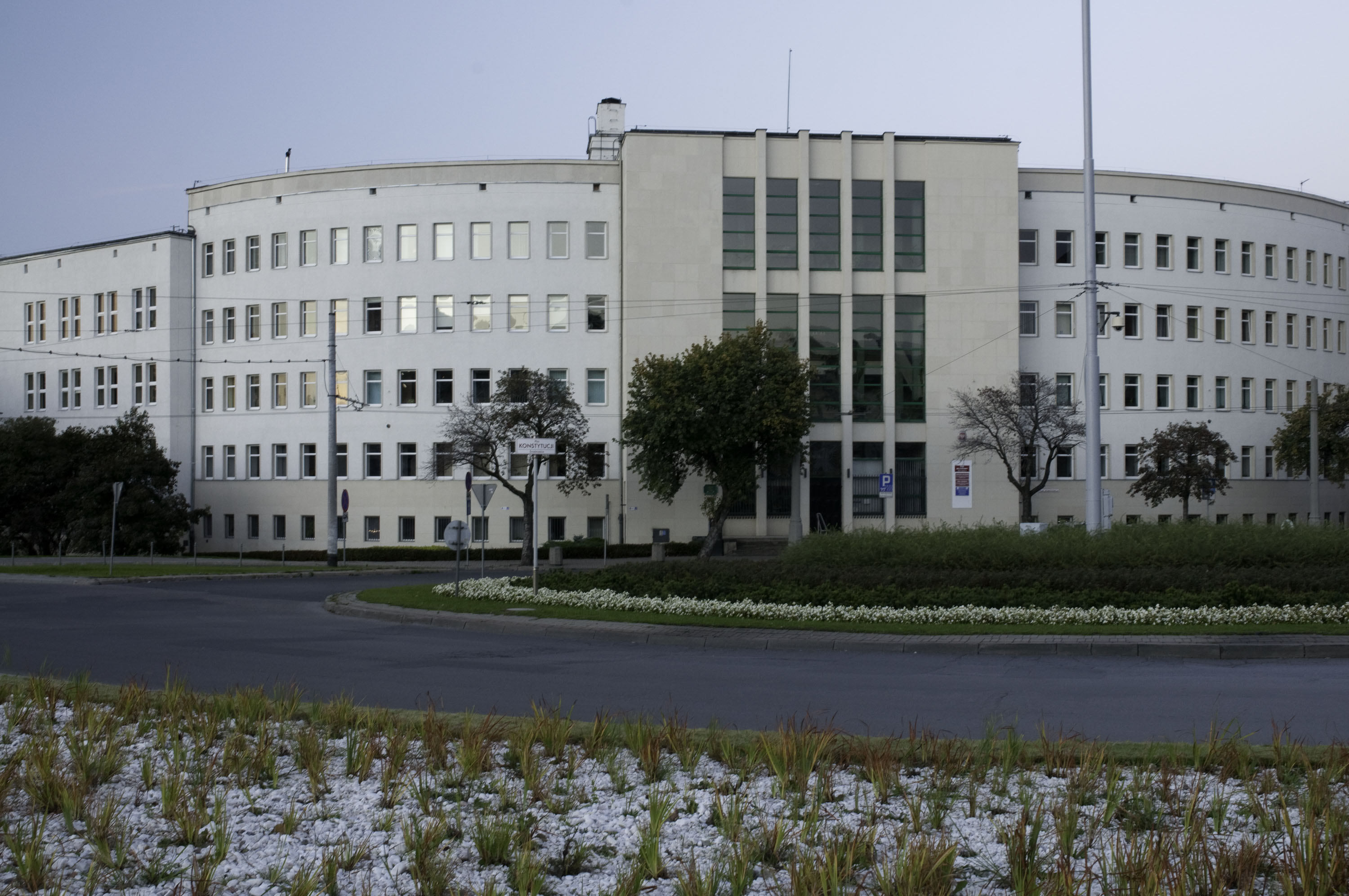
Gdynia Courthouse by Zbigniew Karpiński, 1936

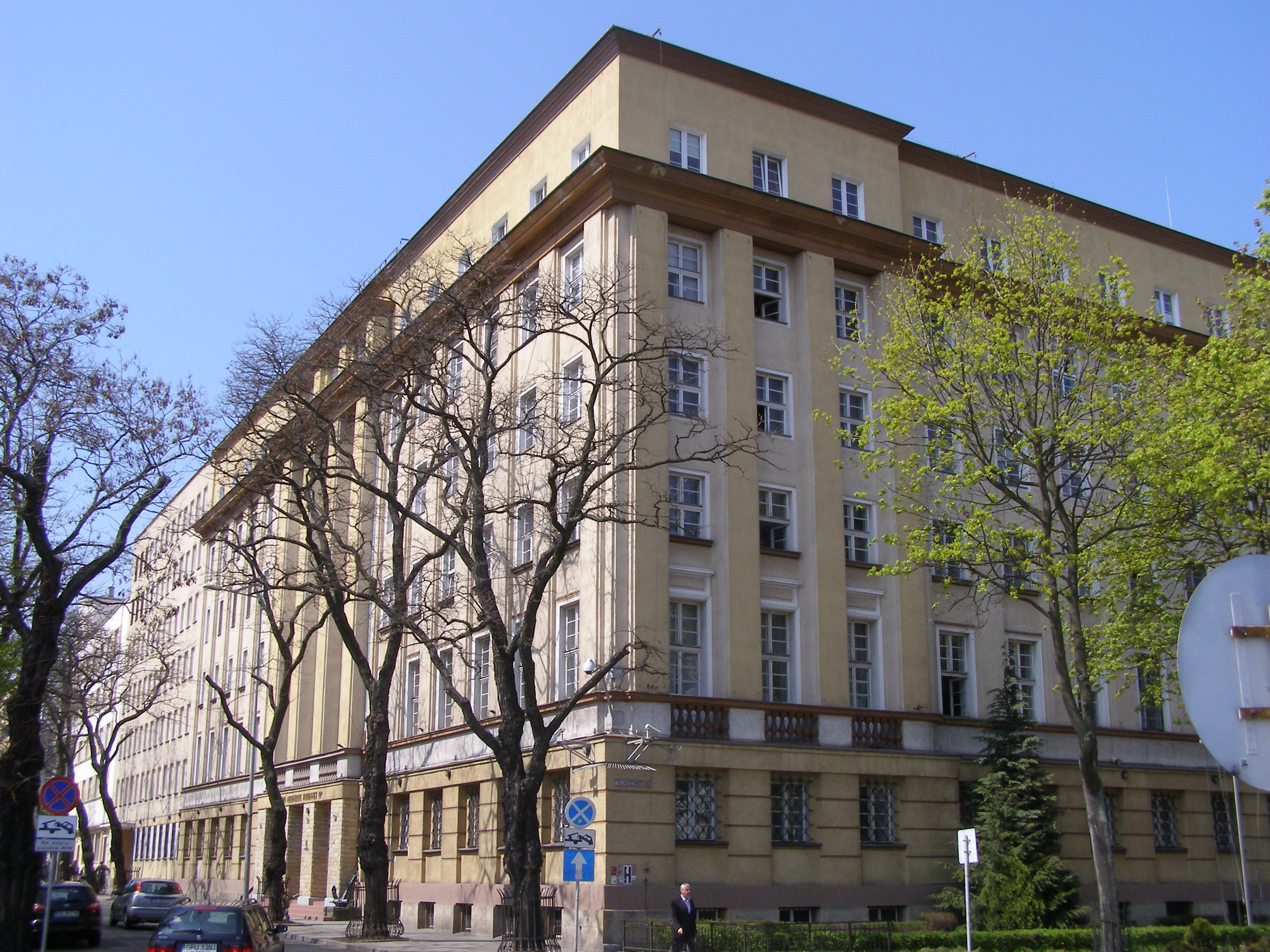
Headquarters of the Polish Navy

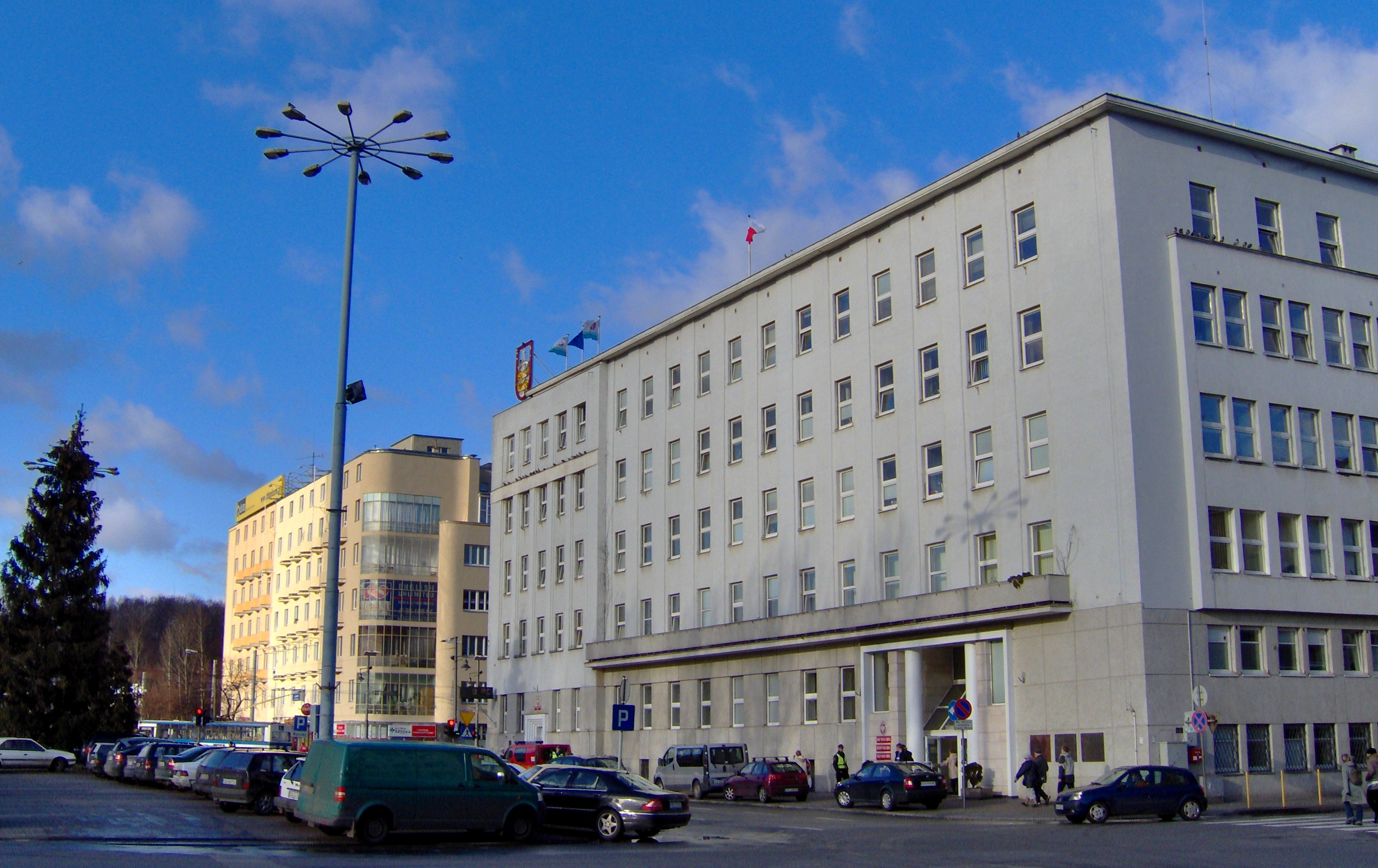
Piłsudski Avenue with modernist buildings

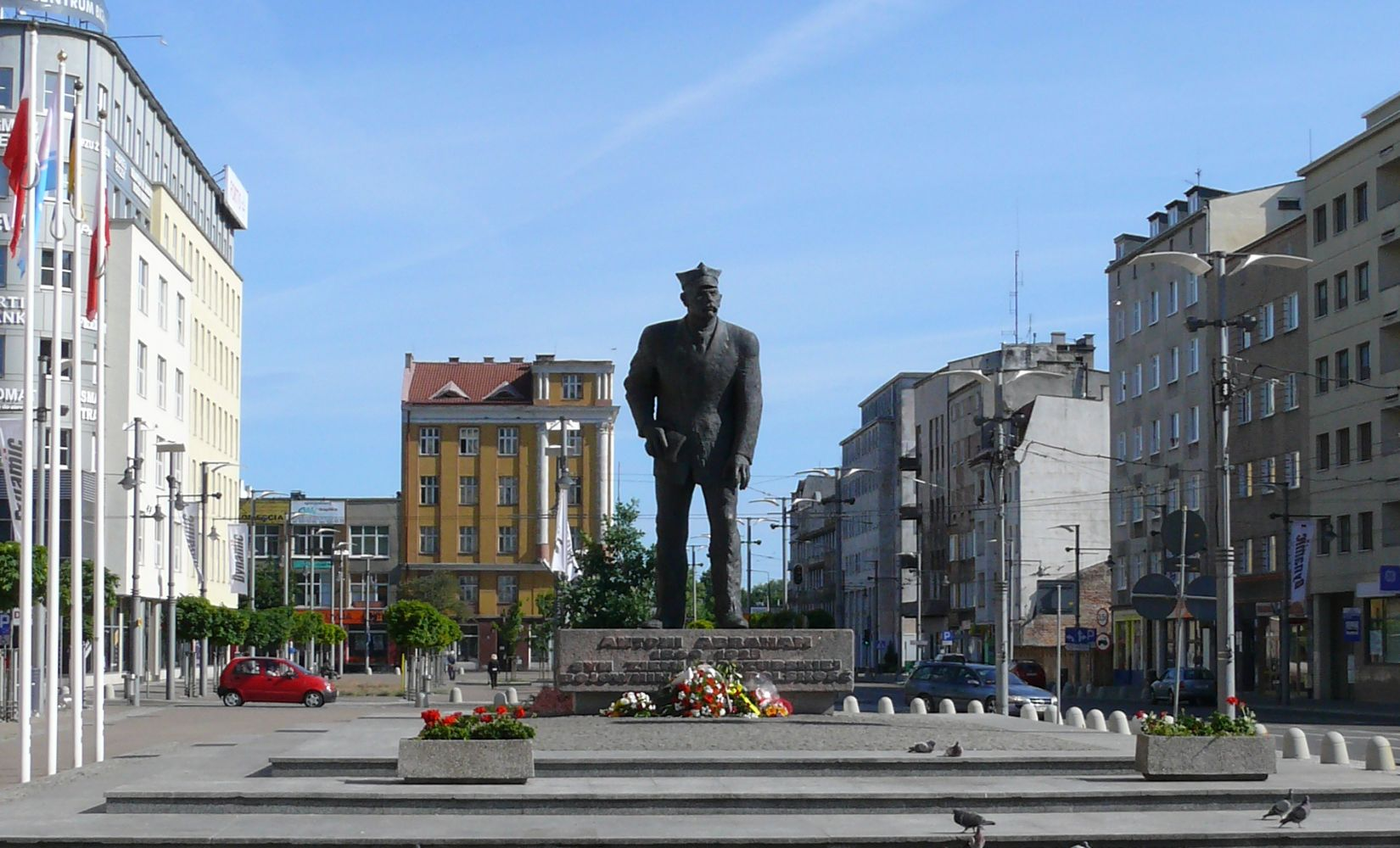
Plac Kaszubski, one of the main squares in the city

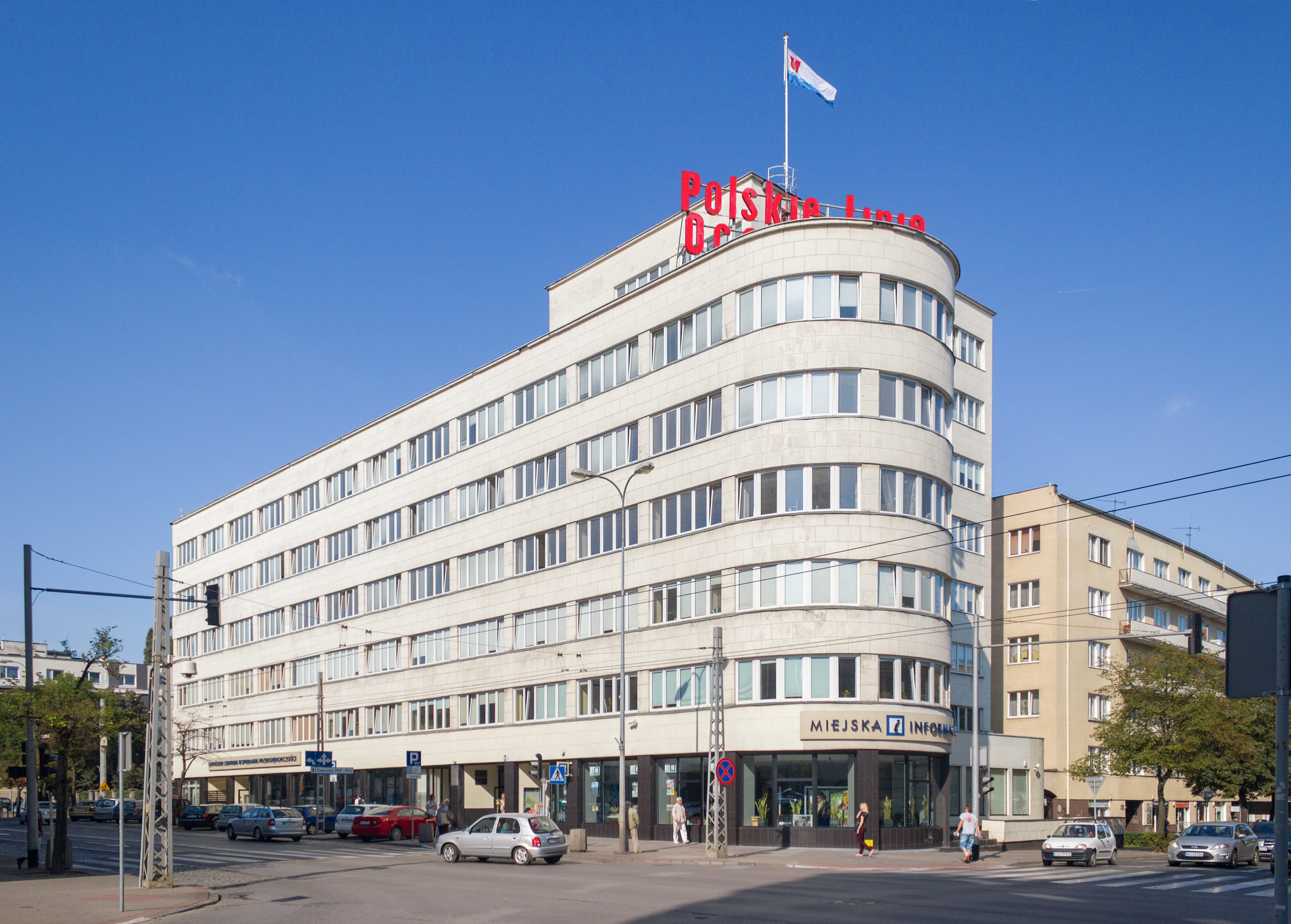
PLO Building designed by Roman Piotrowski

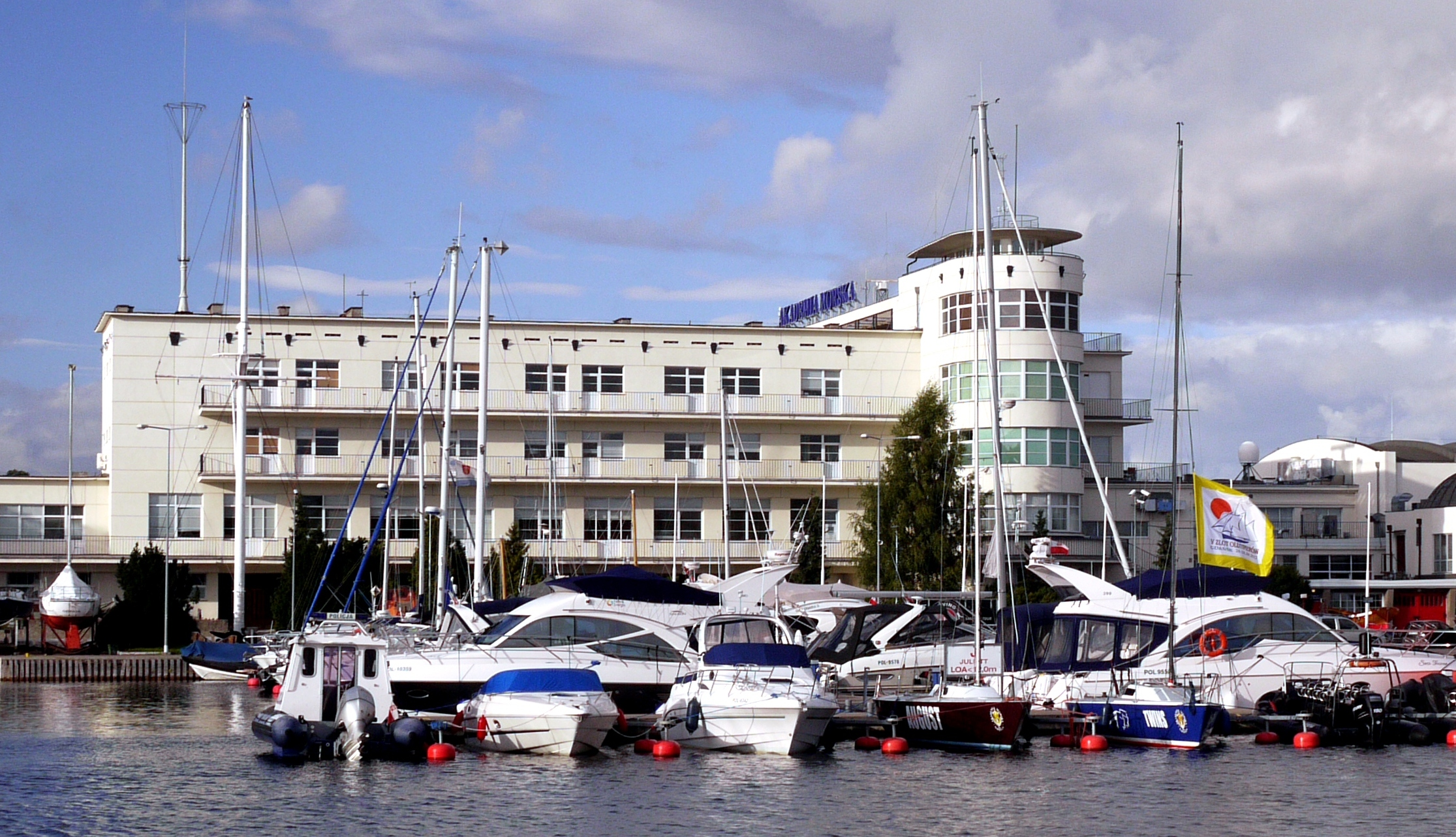
Dom Żeglarza Polskiego, 1938–39, by Tadeusz Sieczkowski and Bohdan Damięcki

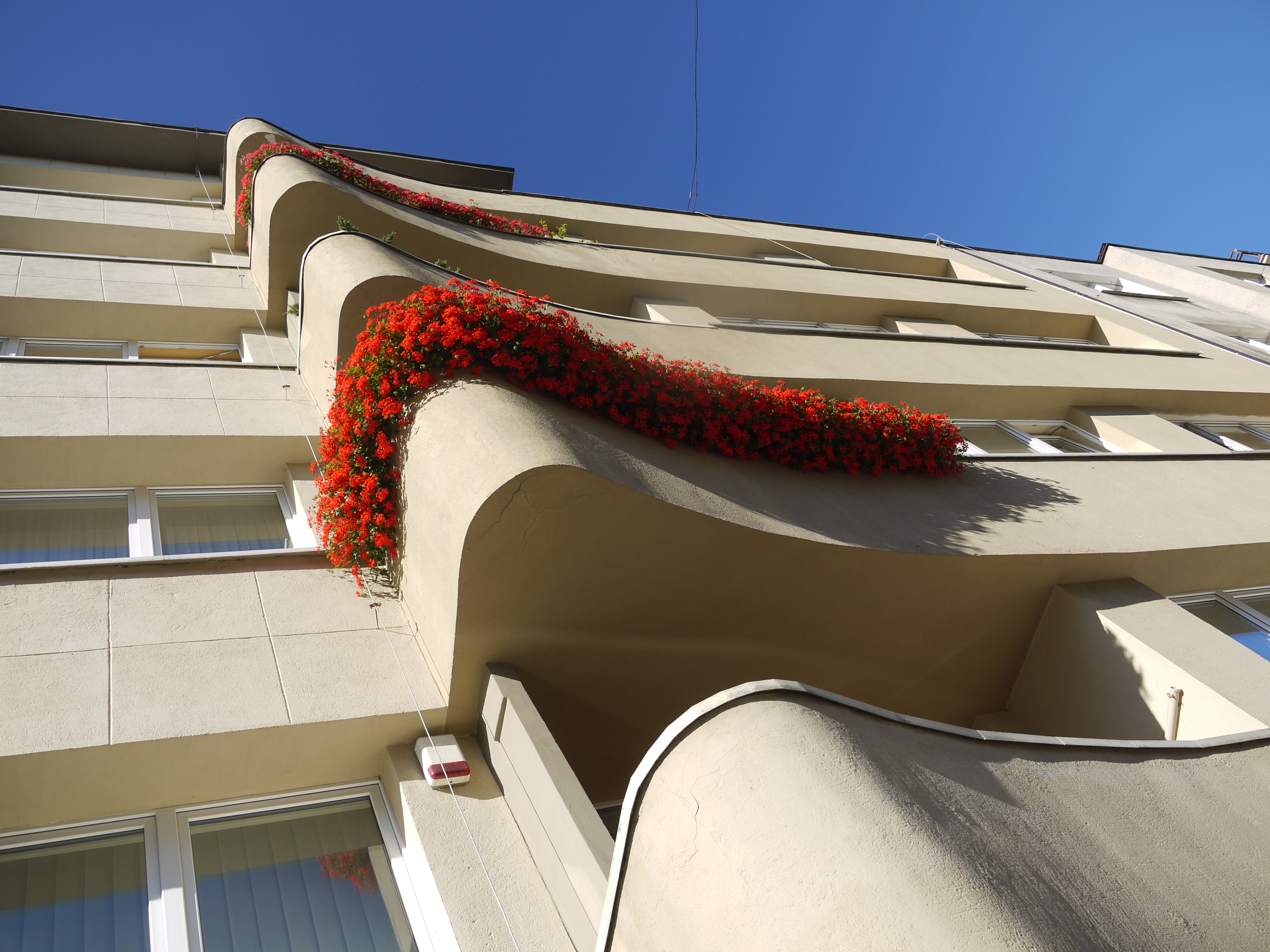
Krenski House, detail, by Zbigniew Kupiec

=== Gdynia during World War II (1939–1945) ===
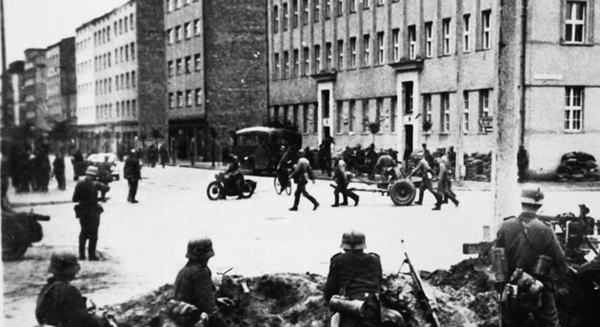
German occupying forces in Gdynia in 1939

During the German invasion of Poland, which started World War II in September 1939, Gdynia was the site of fierce Polish defense. On 13 September 1939, the Germans carried out first arrests of local Poles in the southern part of the city, while the Polish defense was still ongoing in the northern part. On 14 September 1939, the Germans captured the entire city, and then occupied it until 1945. On 15–16 September, the Germans carried out further mass arrests of 7,000 Poles, while Polish soldiers still fought in nearby Kępa Oksywska. The German police surrounded the city and carried out mass searches of weapons. Arrested Poles were held and interrogated in churches, cinemas and halls, and then around 3,000 people were released until 18 September. The occupiers established several prisons and camps for Polish people, who were afterwards either deported to concentration camps or executed. Some Poles from Gdynia were executed by the Germans near Starogard Gdański in September 1939.

In October and November 1939, the Germans carried out public executions of 52 Poles, including activists, bank directors and priests, in various parts of the city. In November 1939, the occupiers also murdered hundreds of Poles from Gdynia during the massacres in Piaśnica committed nearby as part of the Intelligenzaktion. Among the victims were policemen, officials, civil defenders of Gdynia, judges, court employees, the director and employees of the National Bank of Poland, merchants, priests, school principals, teachers, and students of local high schools. On the night of 10–11 November, the German security police carried out mass arrests of over 1,500 Poles in the Obłuże district, and then murdered 23 young men aged 16–20, in retaliation for breaking windows at the headquarters of the German security police.

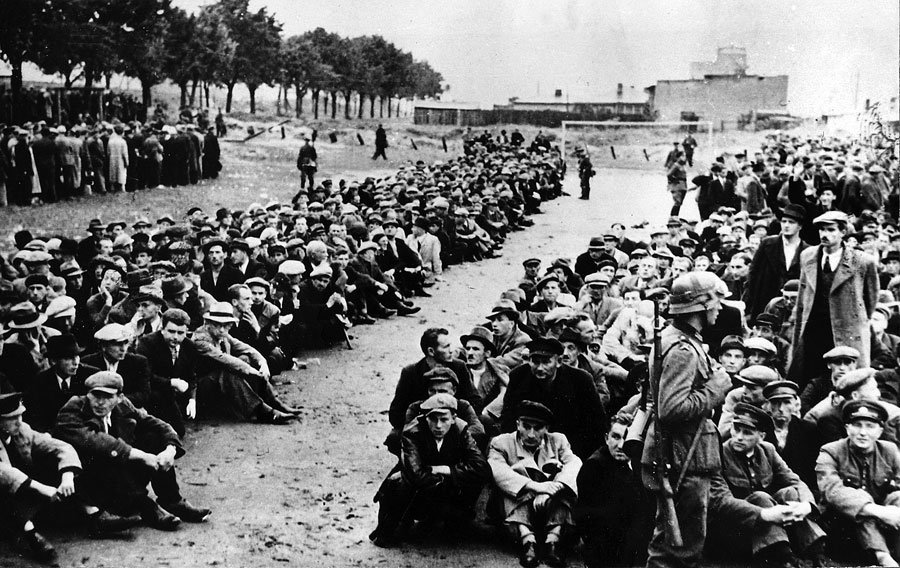
Poles arrested by the Germans in Gdynia in September 1939

On 11 November, a German gendarme shot and killed two Polish boys who were collecting Polish books from the street, which were thrown out of the windows by new German settlers in the Oksywie district. The Germans renamed the city to Gotenhafen after the Goths, an ancient Germanic tribe, who had lived in the area. 10 Poles from Gdynia were also murdered by the Russians in the large Katyn massacre in April–May 1940.

Some 50,000 Polish citizens were expelled to the General Government (German-occupied central Poland) to make space for new German settlers in accordance with the Lebensraum policy. Local Kashubians who were suspected to support the Polish cause, particularly those with higher education, were also arrested and executed. The German gauleiter Albert Forster considered Kashubians of "low value" and did not support any attempts to create a Kashubian nationality. Despite such circumstances, local Poles, including Kashubians, organized Polish resistance groups, Kashubian Griffin (later Pomeranian Griffin), the exiled "Związek Pomorski" in the United Kingdom, and local units of the Home Army, Service for Poland's Victory and Gray Ranks. Activities included distribution of underground Polish press, smuggling data on German persecution of Poles and Jews to Western Europe, sabotage actions, espionage of the local German industry, and facilitating escapes of endangered Polish resistance members and British and French prisoners of war who fled from German POW camps via the city's port to neutral Sweden. The Gestapo cracked down on the Polish resistance several times, with the Poles either killed or deported to the Stutthof and Ravensbrück concentration camps. In 1943, local Poles managed to save some kidnapped Polish children from the Zamość region, by buying them from the Germans at the local train station.

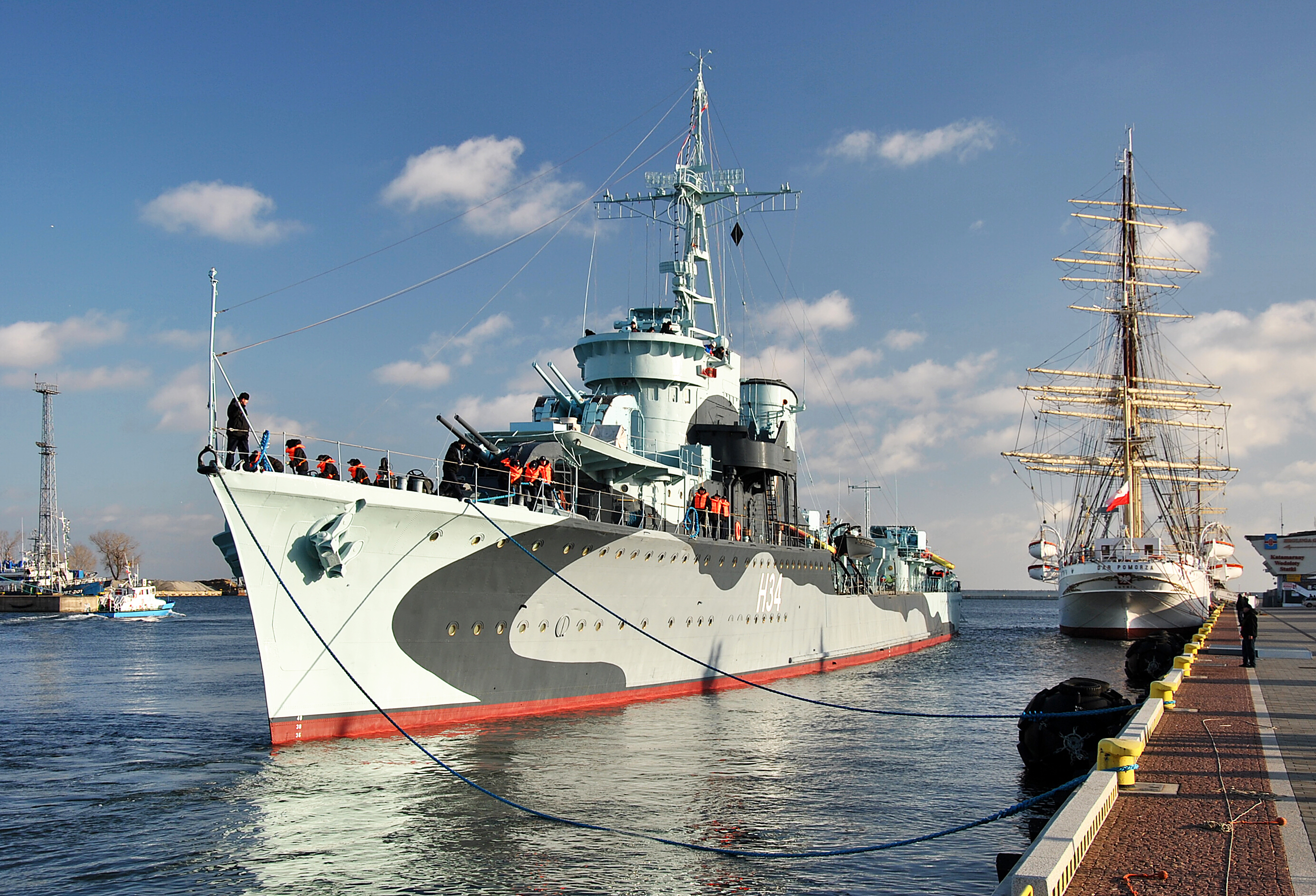
ORP Błyskawica, Polish destroyer which served in World War II, now a museum ship

The harbour was transformed into a German naval base. The shipyard was expanded in 1940 and became a branch of the Kiel shipyard (Deutsche Werke Kiel A.G.). The city became an important base, due to its being relatively distant from the war theater, and many German large ships—battleships and heavy cruisers—were anchored there. During 1942, Dr Joseph Goebbels authorized relocation of Cap Arcona to Gotenhafen Harbour as a stand-in for RMS Titanic during filming of the German-produced movie Titanic, directed by Herbert Selpin.

The Germans set up an Einsatzgruppen-operated penal camp in the Grabówek district, a transit camp for Allied marine POWs, a forced labour subcamp of the Stalag XX-B POW camp for several hundred Allied POWs at the shipyard, and two subcamps of the Stutthof concentration camp, the first located in the Orłowo district in 1941–1942, the second, named Gotenhafen, located at the shipyard in 1944–1945.

The seaport and the shipyard both witnessed several air raids by the Allies from 1943 onwards, but suffered little damage. Gdynia was used during winter 1944–45 to evacuate German troops and refugees trapped by the Red Army. Some of the ships were hit by torpedoes from Soviet submarines in the Baltic Sea on the route west. The ship Wilhelm Gustloff sank, taking about 9,400 people with her – the worst loss of life in a single sinking in maritime history. The seaport area was largely destroyed by withdrawing German troops and millions of encircled refugees in 1945 being bombarded by the Soviet military (90% of the buildings and equipment were destroyed) and the harbour entrance was blocked by the German battleship Gneisenau that had been brought to Gotenhafen for major repairs.

=== After World War II ===
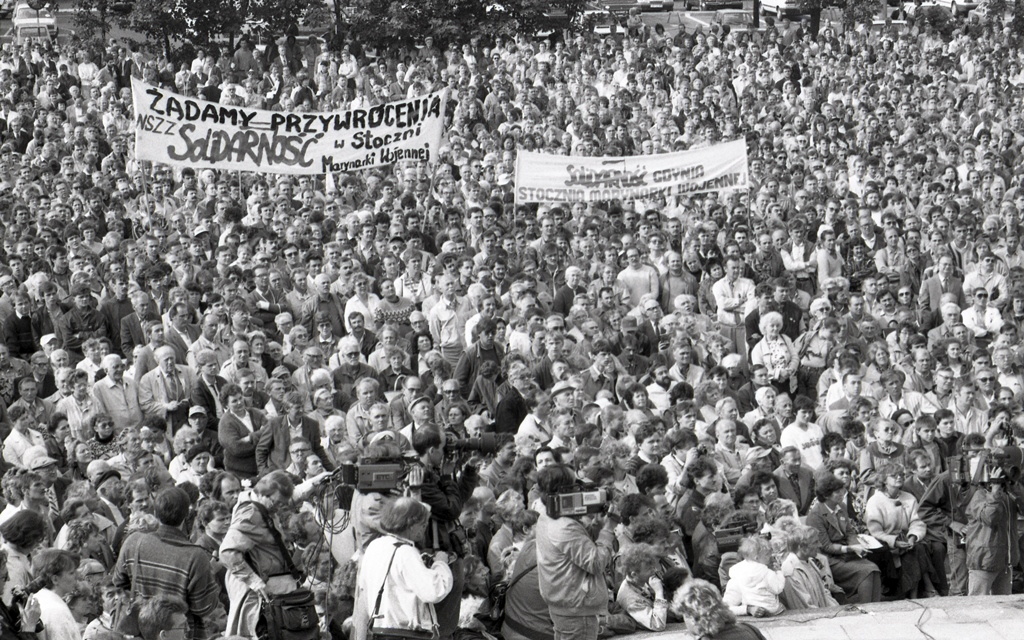
Solidarity election rally in Gdynia, 1989

On 28 March 1945, the city was captured by the Soviet Red Army and restored to Poland, which in the aftermath of World War II became the Polish People's Republic. The post-war period saw an influx of settlers from Warsaw which was destroyed by Germany, and other parts of the country as well as Poles from the cities of Wilno (now Vilnius) and Lwów (now Lviv) from the Soviet-annexed former eastern Poland. Also Greeks, refugees of the Greek Civil War, settled in the city. The port of Gdynia was one of the three Polish ports through which refugees of the Greek Civil War reached Poland.

On 17 December 1970, worker demonstrations took place at Gdynia Shipyard. Workers were fired upon by the police. Zbyszek Godlewski was one of 40 killed, and was commemorated in a song by Mieczysław Cholewa as Janek Wiśniewski (author did know about the events, but did not know the name of the victim), Pieśń o Janku z Gdyni. One of Gdynia's important streets is named after Janek Wiśniewski. The event was also portrayed in Andrzej Wajda's movie Man of Iron.

On 4 December 1999, Storm Anatol toppled a large gantry crane at Gdynia Shipyard.

=== 21st century ===
Following the strategic foundation laid by the late Mayor Franciszka Cegielska in the 1990s, Gdynia transitioned into the 21st century focusing on European integration, urban accessibility, and large-scale architectural modernization. In 2002, the Parliamentary Assembly of the Council of Europe awarded Gdynia the prestigious Europe Prize for its exceptional achievements in promoting the European ideal and international partnerships.

The city's spatial development underwent a notable shift, gradually transforming the post-industrial waterfront into mixed-use modern urban zones. The architectural hallmark of this era became the Sea Towers residential and commercial complex, completed in 2009. Standing at a maximum height of 141 metres, the twin towers became the tallest residential structure on the Baltic coastline. This anchored the broader development of the Gdynia Waterfront area, which integrated contemporary corporate offices, high-end residential quarters, and premium hospitality infrastructure—such as the Courtyard by Marriott Gdynia Waterfront—directly into the harbor area.

During this period, Gdynia achieved significant recognition in international urban indices. In 2019, the European Commission awarded the city the third prize in the international Access City Award competition, recognizing Gdynia's extensive infrastructure adaptations and social inclusion programs for individuals with disabilities. Furthermore, in 2021, Gdynia received the European Union's prestigious CIVITAS Legacy Award for its systematic implementation of sustainable urban mobility policies, highlighted by the expansion of its zero-emission trolleybus network, dedicated bus lanes, and pedestrian-friendly public spaces.

Politically, the first two decades of the century were characterized by governance continuity under Wojciech Szczurek, who served as Mayor from 1998 to 2024. While his administration oversaw major structural investments, prolonged political dominance eventually generated public debate regarding municipal debt and infrastructural delays. In the local government elections of April 2024, a major political shift occurred when Szczurek failed to advance past the first voting round. Aleksandra Kosiorek of the Gdyński Dialog coalition subsequently won the mayoral runoff election, assuming office with a policy focused on financial restructuring and civic transparency.

=== Centenary of city rights and UNESCO inscription ===
In 2026, Gdynia celebrated the centenary of receiving its city rights on 10 February 1926. This milestone coincided with a historic achievement: the inscription of the city’s modernist centre onto the World Heritage List as the Gdynia Modernist City Centre. To mark the double occasion, the city hosted a year-long programme of cultural, artistic, sporting, and civic events across all of its districts.

The celebrations peaked during the summer months. Major highlights included a massive free concert on Kościuszki Square titled ‘‘It Began with the Sea – Gdynia 100’’, and the Summer Birthday of Gdynia on 22 August. The latter featured a record-breaking 600-metre-long communal birthday table and a diverse lineup of free live music, culminating in a headline performance by sanah on the Southern Pier. Gdynia’s individual districts also drove the centenary spirit forward by staging localized festivals, collaborative neighborhood concerts, and community feasts.

The events took on an international dimension with the arrival of delegations from 12 of Gdynia’s global sister cities, who visited to honor both the centenary and the new UNESCO status. The historic year was visually captured on 6 September, when thousands of residents gathered to film ‘‘Gdynia LIPDUB 100’’, a massive, city-wide one-take audiovisual project created to commemorate the community's centenary spirit.

== Geography ==
=== Climate ===
According to the Köppen climate classification, Gdynia has an oceanic climate (Cfb), strongly influenced by its coastal location on the Baltic Sea. The sea moderates temperatures throughout the year, producing relatively mild winters, cooler summers compared with inland Poland, and a longer transitional autumn season, with the annual mean temperature of about 8.8 °C and annual precipitation of 792 mm.

The maritime influence is particularly visible in the seasonal temperature pattern. Spring temperatures rise more slowly than in inland areas because of the cold waters of the Baltic Sea, while autumn remains relatively mild due to the sea retaining heat accumulated during summer.

Poland is warming about twice as fast as the global average. In Gdynia this is visible in the shortening of winter with snow cover from ~45 days in the 1970s to ~20 days now. The city receives 2,453 hours of sunshine per year on average. Around the summer solstice, daylight lasts for more than 16 hours.

The lowest pressure ever recorded in Poland – 960.2 hPa on 17 January 1931 – was measured in Gdynia.

==== Precipitation, thunderstorms and windstorms ====
Annual precipitation in Gdynia is relatively evenly distributed throughout the year, with increased rainfall typically occurring during the summer months. Climate normals published by IMGW-PIB show annual precipitation totals of 750–900 mm, with the highest monthly values generally occurring in July and August. For 1991–2021 the monthly means are 55 mm in January, 98 mm in July and 86 mm in August, 792 mm annually.

Annual precipitation in Gdynia is relatively evenly distributed throughout the year, with increased rainfall typically occurring during the summer months. Climate normals published by IMGW-PIB show annual precipitation totals of 750–900 mm, with the highest monthly values generally occurring in July and August.

The highest daily totals in the region in the 21st century were recorded during a Genoa low on 14–15 July 2016. In Gdynia, precipitation sum exceeding 150 mm was recorded from the afternoon of 14 July to the morning of 15 July. The event led to widespread flash flooding. Genoa lows typically bring 80 to even 130 mm in such episodes, most of it in a few hours.

From October to March, Gdynia is exposed to European windstorms of Atlantic origin. The strongest winds blow from the west and north-west. The annual mean wind speed at the coast is about 15 mph (24 km/h), highest in January with 17 mph. First-degree IMGW warnings for Gdynia, Sopot and Gdańsk are typically issued for average winds up to 50 km/h and gusts up to 80 km/h. In severe European windstorms gusts regularly reach 110 km/h in the Bay of Gdańsk.

Historical extremes are significantly higher. The lowest atmospheric pressure ever recorded in Poland, 960.2 hPa on 17 January 1931, was measured in Gdynia during a deep Atlantic low. The strongest storm in modern Polish records, in November 1964, produced gusts of 162 km/h in Gdańsk. More recently, Orkan Ksawery / Xaver on 5–6 December 2013, defined by highest 3-second gusts over 72 hours, brought gusts of 115–125 km/h to the central Baltic coast, with 125 km/h recorded in Darłówko and 117 km/h at Rozewie. During such events the sea level at Gdynia can rise by over 80 cm in 24 hours, contributing to coastal flooding.

==== Sea temperature and Baltic warming ====
Average annual sea surface temperature at Gdynia is about 10.0 °C.

Satellite reanalysis shows minima around 0.9 °C in January and 0.4 °C in February, and maxima up to 21.7 °C in July and 21.3 °C in August.

The Baltic is one of the fastest-warming seas in Europe. The Copernicus Marine Service cumulative SST trend for 1993–2023 shows a strong positive anomaly across the entire Baltic basin.

==== Sea ice and sea levels ====
Historically, winters with extensive sea ice occurred more frequently in the Gulf of Gdańsk and other parts of the Baltic Sea. Severe cold periods in the 20th century produced substantial ice cover, affecting maritime navigation and port operations in Gdynia.

In recent decades, persistent coastal sea ice has become less frequent as average winter temperatures have increased. In February 2024, the Institute of Oceanology reported Baltic water levels 67 cm below normal, the lowest since systematic measurements began in 1886.

Climate data for Gdynia (1991–2020 normals, extremes 1951–present)
	Jan	Feb	Mar	Apr	May	Jun	Jul	Aug	Sep	Oct	Nov	Dec	Year
Record high °C (°F)	13.2 (55.8)	14.4 (57.9)	22.9 (73.2)	28.9 (84.0)	30.3 (86.5)	33.2 (91.8)	35.5 (95.9)	33.4 (92.1)	30.7 (87.3)	26.9 (80.4)	19.8 (67.6)	13.7 (56.7)	35.5 (95.9)
Mean maximum °C (°F)	8.7 (47.7)	8.4 (47.1)	14.2 (57.6)	19.4 (66.9)	23.6 (74.5)	26.2 (79.2)	28.0 (82.4)	27.8 (82.0)	23.1 (73.6)	19.3 (66.7)	12.6 (54.7)	9.4 (48.9)	18.4 (65.1)
Mean daily maximum °C (°F)	1.2 (36.2)	2.0 (35.6)	5.5 (41.9)	10.7 (51.3)	15.6 (60.1)	18.9 (66.0)	21.2 (70.2)	21.2 (70.2)	17.4 (63.3)	12.0 (53.6)	7.1 (44.8)	3.3 (37.9)	11.3 (52.3)
Daily mean °C (°F)	0.1 (31.1)	0.0 (32.0)	2.7 (36.9)	7.2 (45.0)	12.1 (53.8)	15.7 (60.3)	18.3 (64.9)	18.2 (64.8)	14.6 (58.3)	9.7 (49.5)	5.4 (41.7)	1.8 (35.2)	8.8 (47.8)
Mean daily minimum °C (°F)	-2.2 (28.0)	-2.0 (28.4)	-0.1 (31.8)	3.5 (38.3)	8.2 (46.8)	12.1 (53.8)	15.0 (59.0)	15.1 (59.2)	11.9 (53.4)	7.5 (45.5)	3.7 (38.7)	0.1 (32.2)	6.1 (43.0)
Mean minimum °C (°F)	-9.6 (14.7)	-8.1 (17.4)	-4.5 (23.9)	-0.7 (30.7)	3.8 (38.8)	8.0 (46.4)	11.3 (52.3)	10.9 (51.6)	7.0 (44.6)	1.4 (34.5)	-3.1 (26.4)	-7.7 (18.1)	-12.0 (10.4)
Record low °C (°F)	-19.7 (-3.5)	-23.8 (-10.8)	-13.8 (7.2)	-4.9 (23.2)	-0.6 (30.9)	3.8 (38.8)	8.1 (46.6)	7.0 (44.6)	2.1 (35.8)	-3.6 (25.5)	-11.7 (10.9)	-17.8 (0.0)	-23.8 (-10.8)
Avg precipitation mm (inches)	55 (2.17)	46 (1.81)	50 (1.97)	48 (1.89)	66 (2.60)	77 (3.03)	98 (3.86)	86 (3.39)	75 (2.95)	70 (2.76)	60 (2.36)	61 (2.40)	792 (31.18)
Avg precipitation days	10	9	9	8	8	10	11	10	9	10	10	10	113
Avg relative humidity (%)	83	83	79	75	74	73	77	76	77	80	85	84	79
Avg dew point °C (°F)	-3 (27)	-3 (27)	-1 (30)	2 (36)	6 (43)	10 (50)	13 (55)	12 (54)	9 (48)	6 (43)	2 (36)	-1 (30)	4 (40)
Mean monthly sunshine hours	69	92	171	261	332	335	329	313	228	158	90	68	2446
Sea temperature mean °C (°F)	3.6 (38)	2.4 (36)	2.6 (37)	4.9 (41)	9.3 (49)	14.4 (58)	18.3 (65)	19.2 (67)	16.9 (62)	12.9 (55)	9.0 (48)	5.9 (43)	10.0 (50)
Sea temperature min °C	0.9	0.4	0.0	1.4	6.1	12.3	15.1	17.0	14.5	9.8	7.0	3.0	—
Sea temperature max °C	5.6	5.0	4.4	7.8	13.9	17.6	21.7	21.3	20.2	16.6	12.3	8.8	—
Source: IMGW-PIB 1991–2020 normals via klimat.imgw.pl, Climate-Data.org 1991–2021, SeaTemperature.org / NOAA SST, Copernicus Baltic SST trend 1993–2023

== Cityscape ==
Dar Pomorza moored in Gdynia, with the Sea Towers and Marina Yacht Park in the background.

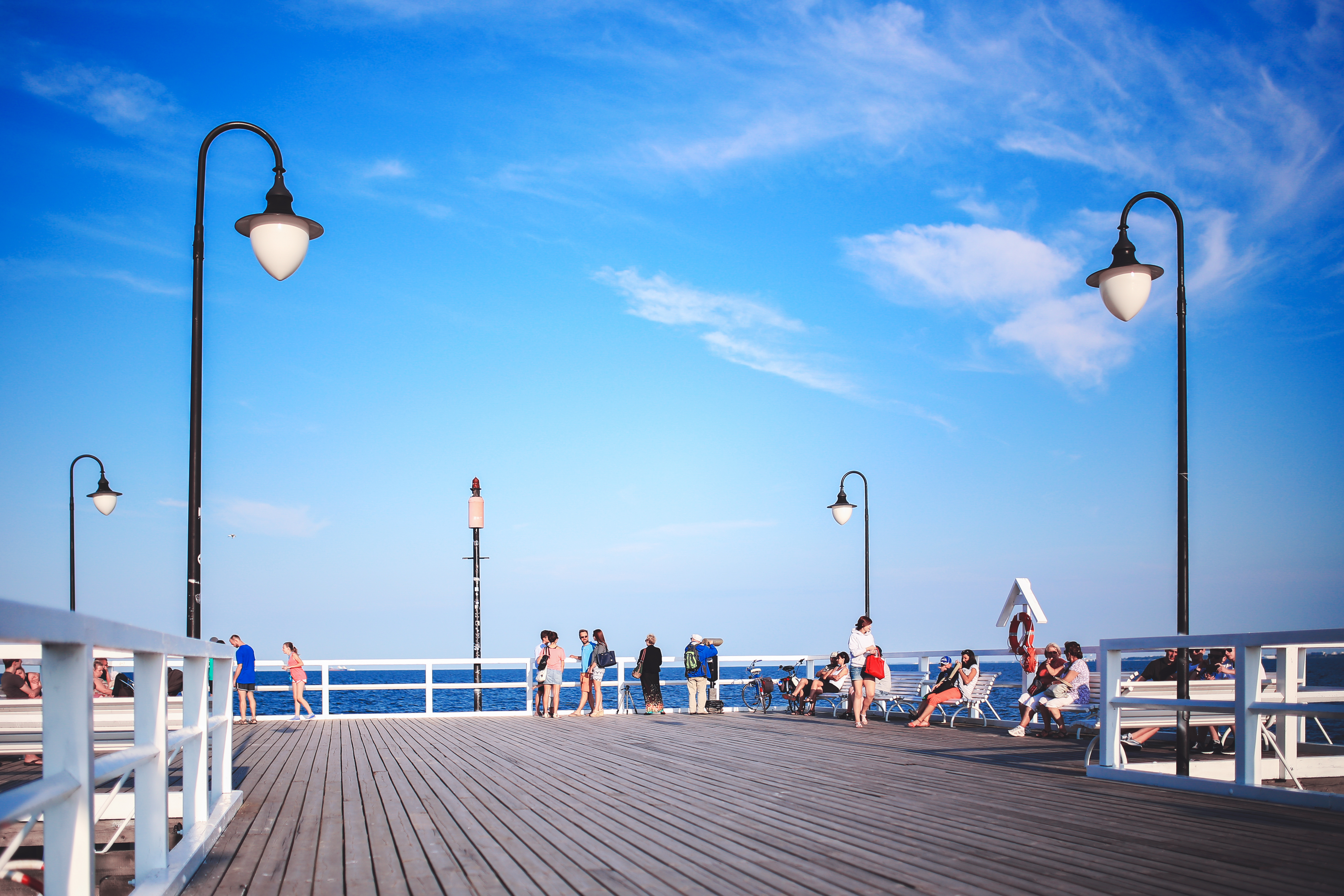
Gdynia's main boardwalk in Orłowo

Gdynia is a relatively modern city. Its architecture includes the 13th century St. Michael the Archangel's Church in Oksywie, the oldest building in Gdynia, and the 17th century neo-Gothic manor house located on Folwarczna Street in Orłowo.

The surrounding hills and the coastline attract many nature lovers. A leisure pier and a cliff-like coastline in Kępa Redłowska, as well as the surrounding Nature Reserve, are also popular locations. In the harbour, there are two anchored museum ships, the destroyer ORP Błyskawica and the tall ship Dar Pomorza. A 1.5-kilometre (0.93 mi)-long promenade leads from the marina in the city centre, to the beach in Redłowo.

Most of Gdynia can be seen from Kamienna Góra (54 metres (177 feet) asl) or two viewing towers, one at Góra Donas, the other at Kolibki.

In 2015 the Emigration Museum opened in the city. Other museums include the Gdynia Aquarium, Experyment Science Center, Abraham's house, Żeromski's house, Gdynia Automotive Museum, Naval Museum, and Gdynia City Museum.

=== Modernist Centre ===
A view looking down 3 Maja Street in Gdynia.

Tenement house on Świętojańska Street in Gdynia.

Gdynia holds an exceptional concentration of early 20th-century architecture, serving as a prominent showcase of monumentalism, early functionalism, and interwar modernism. The Historic Urban Layout of the City Centre was drafted in 1926 by Adam Kuncewicz and Roman Feliński, an urban planner from Lviv, who envisioned the city as a grand maritime "façade" for the newly independent Polish state. The central composition is built around a monumental axis encompassing 10 Lutego Street, Kościuszko Square, and the Southern Pier, a structure intentionally designed to visually and symbolically bind the city layout directly to the Baltic Sea.

The architectural landscape is defined by noble simplicity, clean geometric lines, and extensive glazing designed to optimize natural light. A distinguishing characteristic of Gdynia's functionalism is its frequent incorporation of nautical motifs (Polish: styl okrętowy), featuring streamlined or sharp volumes reminiscent of ship superstructures, rounded corners mimicking ship hulls, porthole-like windows, and exterior stairways stylized as gangplanks. Key public structures exemplifying this era include the avant-garde District Court of Justice (1936), the curved architectural concrete curves of the Polish Yachtsman's House on the pier (1938), and the prominent structural ribs of the city's integrated indoor Markets on Wójta Radtkego street.

Residential architecture from the 1930s along major thoroughfares like Świętojańska Street represents a luxurious variety of functionalism, blending strict modernity with upscale materials like sandstone, marble, and premium metal fittings. Notable examples include the bow-cornered Pręczkowski family tenement (1928–1937), the sculptured sandstone facade of the Orłowski tenement (1936), and the monumental residential block of the BGK Bank Pension Fund (1935–1937), which features high-end custom interiors and integrated elevators. Corporate architecture is highlighted by the former ZUS (Social Insurance Institution) building, designed by Roman Piotrowski in 1935, which served as a flagship modernist symbol and later housed the head offices of the Polish Ocean Lines (PLO).

Gdynia's rapid transformation from a small fishing village into a thriving modernist port city was heavily inspired by premier international trends, drawing design parallels to work by European masters such as Erich Mendelsohn. Consequently, Gdynia is frequently compared to the White City of Tel Aviv, as both seaside cities were constructed from scratch during the early 20th century to embody the ambitions and dreams of their newly independent nations. This ideological and architectural kinship was highlighted in 2019 during the joint exhibition "Gdynia - Tel Aviv" at the POLIN Museum, celebrating their shared modernist building heritage and sea-resort histories. Due to its historical integrity, the center of Gdynia was designated as one of Poland's official national Historic Monuments (Polish: Pomnik Historii) and was inscribed onto the UNESCO World Heritage List.

== Culture ==
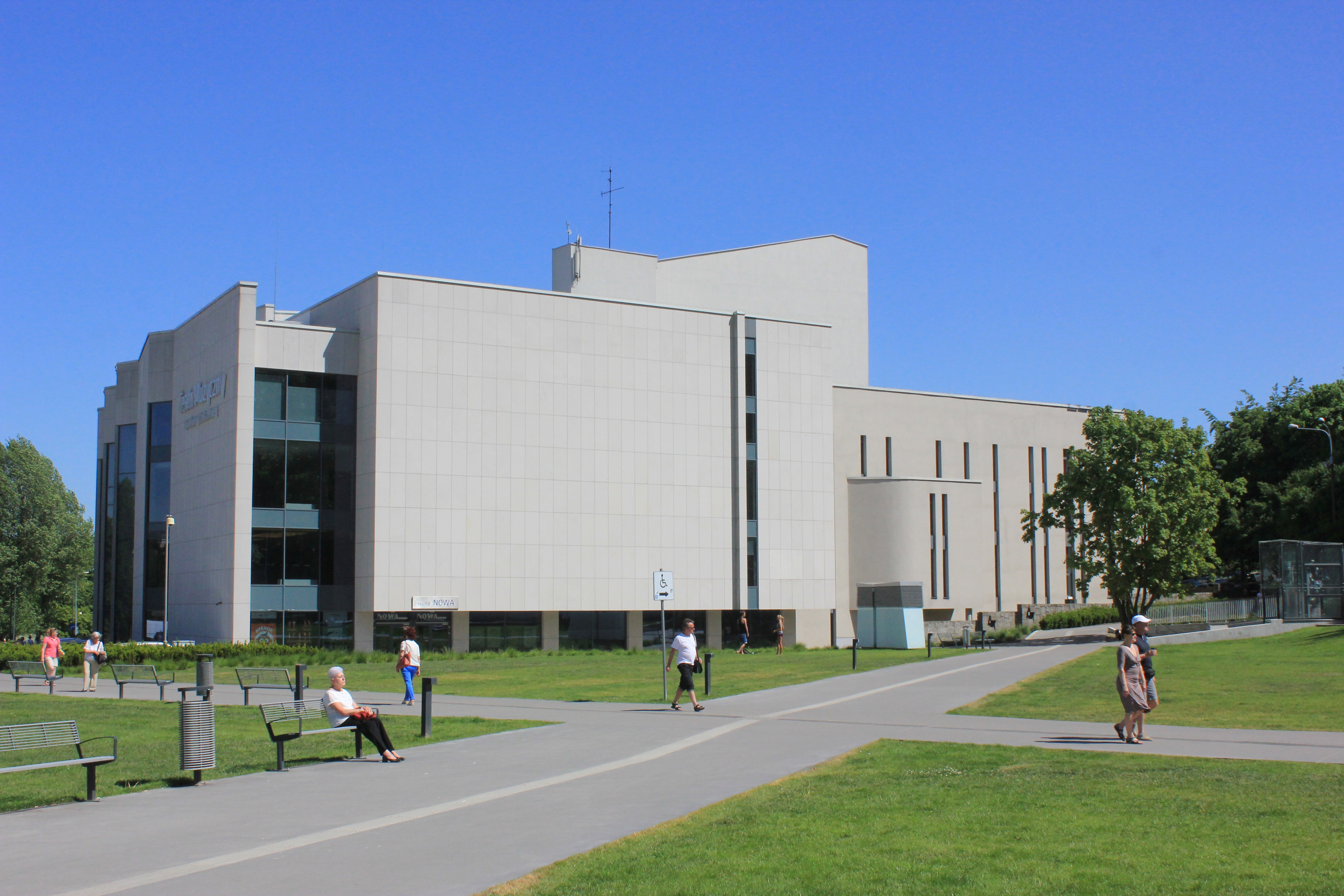
Gdynia's Musical Theatre is a venue for the annual Polish Film Festival

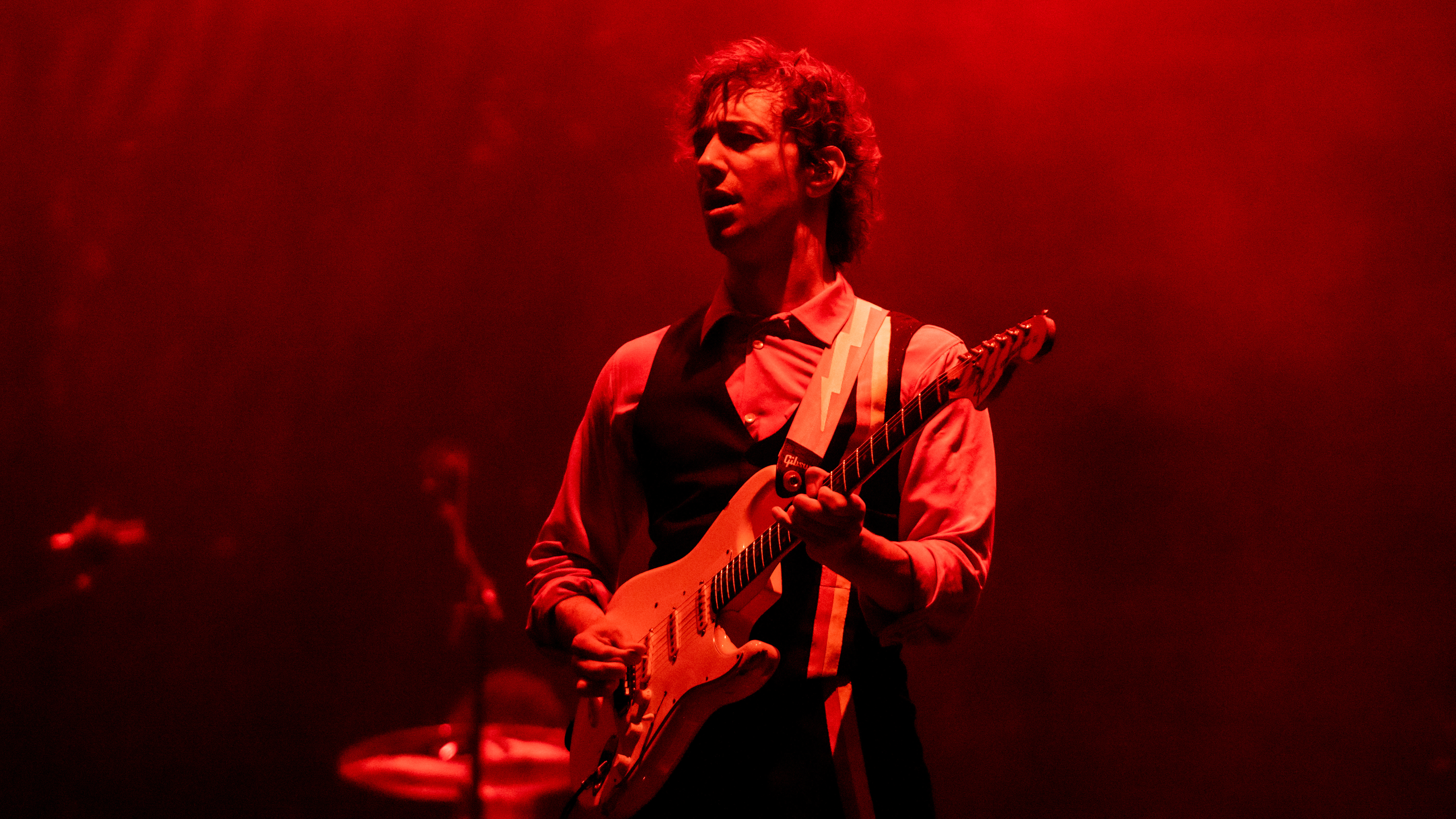
Open'er Festival in 2019

Gdynia hosts the Gdynia Film Festival, the main Polish film festival. The International Random Film Festival was hosted in Gdynia in November 2014. Since 2003 Gdynia has been hosting the Open'er Festival, one of the biggest contemporary music festivals in Europe. The festival welcomes many foreign hip-hop, rock and electronic music artists every year. In record-high 2018 it was attended by over 140,000 people, who enjoyed the lineup headlined by Bruno Mars, Gorillaz, Arctic Monkeys, and Depeche Mode. Another important summer event in Gdynia is the Viva Beach Party, which is a large two-day techno party made on Gdynia's Public Beach and a summer-welcoming concerts CudaWianki. Gdynia also hosts events for the annual Gdańsk Shakespeare Festival.
In the summer of 2014 Gdynia hosted Red Bull Air Race World Championship.

=== Cultural references ===
In 2008, Gdynia made it onto the Monopoly Here and Now World Edition board after being voted by fans through the Internet. Gdynia occupies the space traditionally held by Mediterranean Avenue, being the lowest voted city to make it onto the Monopoly Here and Now board, but also the smallest city to make it in the game. All of the other cities are large and widely known ones, the second smallest being Riga. The unexpected success of Gdynia can be attributed to a mobilization of the town's population to vote for it on the Internet.

An abandoned factory district in Gdynia was the scene for the survival series Man vs Wild, season 6, episode 12. The host, Bear Grylls, manages to escape the district after blowing up a door and crawling through miles of sewer.

Ernst Stavro Blofeld, the supervillain in the James Bond novels, was born in Gdynia on 28 May 1908, according to Thunderball.

Gdynia is sometimes called "Polish Roswell" due to the alleged UFO crash on 21 January 1959.

== Sports ==
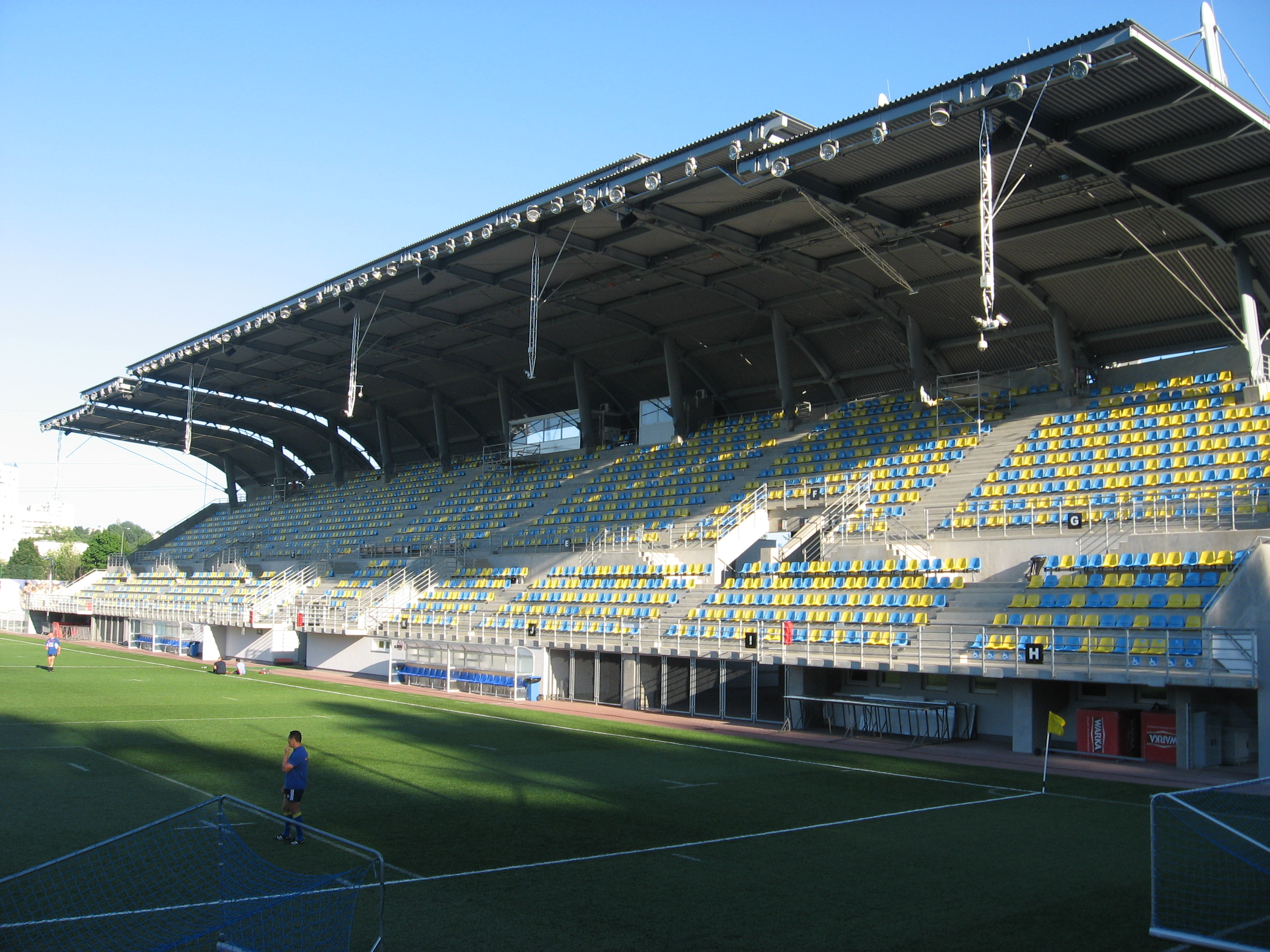
National Rugby Stadium

Sport teams

- Arka Gdynia – men's football team (Polish Cup winner 1979 and 2017, Polish SuperCup winner in 2017 and in 2018. Currently plays in the first division of Polish football, the Ekstraklasa)
- Bałtyk Gdynia – men's football team, currently playing in Polish 4th division
- Arka Gdynia (basketball) – men's basketball team (9 time Polish Basketball League winner)
- Arka Gdynia (women's basketball) – women's basketball team (12-time Basket Liga Kobiet champion)
- RC Arka Gdynia – rugby team (4-time Polish Champions)
- Seahawks Gdynia – American football team (Polish American Football League) (4-time champion of Poland in 2012, 2014 and in 2015)
- Arka Gdynia (handball) – handball team which plays in Ekstraliga (First division of Polish handball)

=== International events ===
- 2017 UEFA European Under-21 Championship
- 2019 FIFA U-20 World Cup
- 2020 World Athletics Half Marathon Championships

== Economy and infrastructure ==
=== Transport ===
==== Port of Gdynia ====
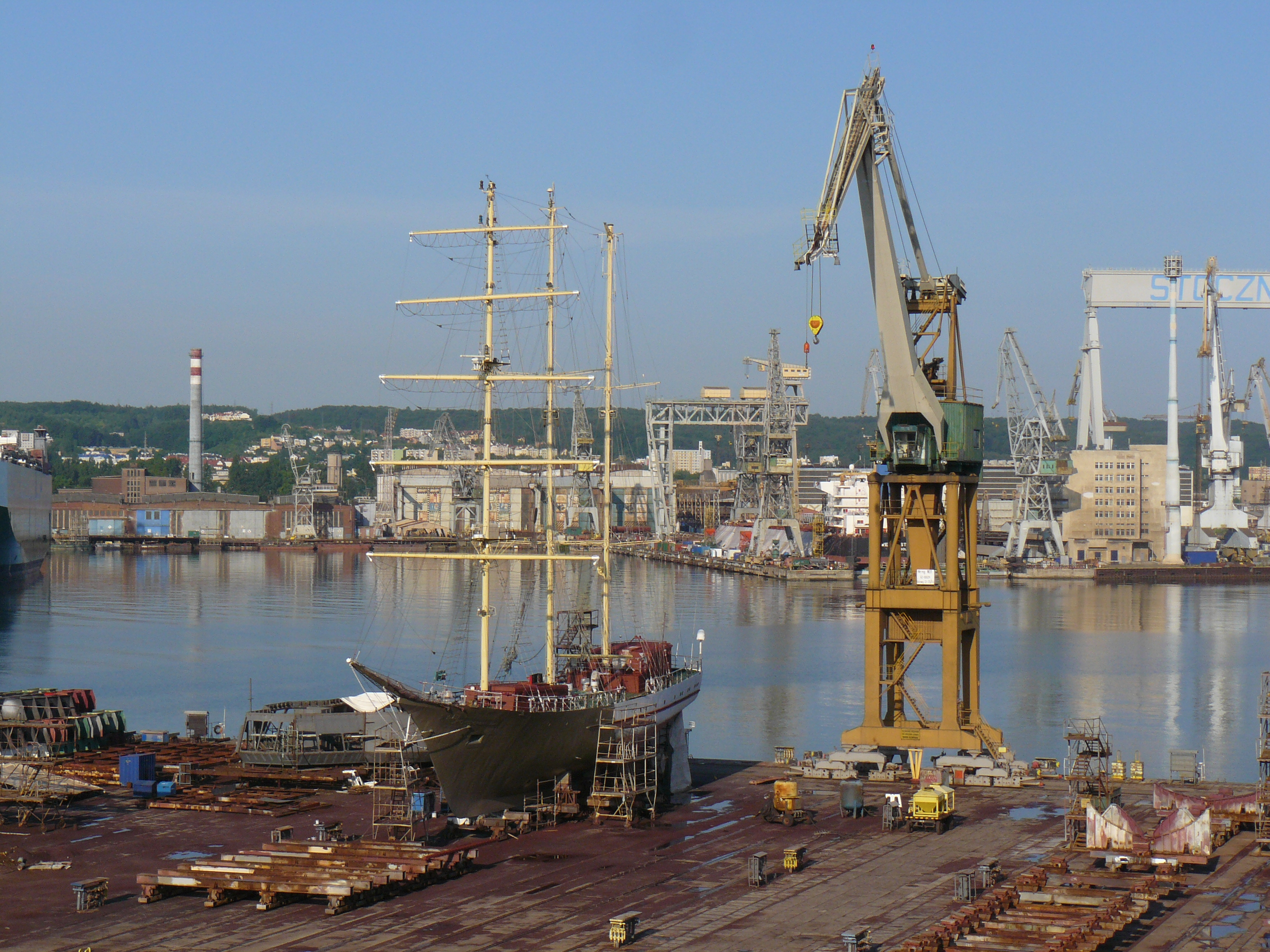
Gdynia Shipyard

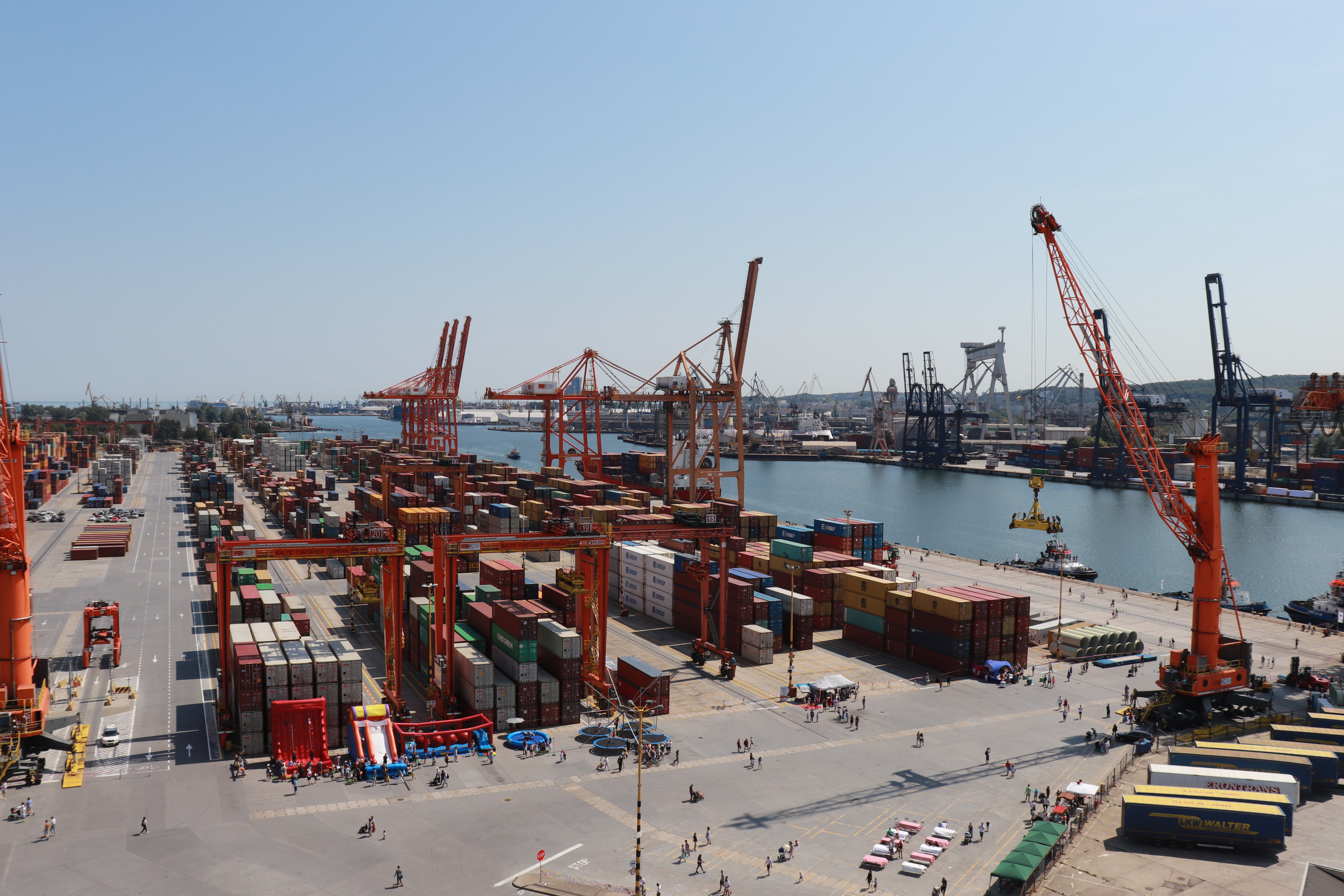
Port of Gdynia

In 2007, 364,202 passengers, 17,025,000 tons of cargo and 614,373 TEU containers passed through the port. Regular car ferry service operates between Gdynia and Karlskrona, Sweden.

==== Public transport ====
Gdynia operates one of only three trolleybus systems in Poland, alongside Lublin and Tychy. Today there are 18 trolleybus lines in Gdynia with a total length of 96 km (60 mi). The fleet is modern and consists of Solaris Trollino cars. There is also a historic line, connecting city centre with a district of Orłowo operated by five retro trolleybuses. In addition to that, Gdynia operates an extensive network of bus lines, connecting the city with the adjacent suburbs.

==== Airport ====
The conurbation's main airport, Gdańsk Lech Wałęsa Airport, lays approximately 25 kilometres (16 mi) south-west of central Gdynia, and has connections to approximately 55 destinations. It is the third largest airport in Poland. A second General Aviation terminal was scheduled to be opened by May 2012, which will increase the airport's capacity to 5mln passengers per year.

Another local airport, (Gdynia-Kosakowo Airport) is situated partly in the village of Kosakowo, just to the north of the city, and partly in Gdynia. This has been a military airport since the World War II, but it has been decided in 2006 that the airport will be used to serve civilians. Work was well in progress and was due to be ready for 2012 when the project collapsed following a February 2014 EU decision regarding Gdynia city funding as constituting unfair competition to Gdańsk airport. In March 2014, the airport management company filed for bankruptcy, this being formally announced in May that year. The fate of some PLN 100 million of public funds from Gdynia remain unaccounted for with documents not being released, despite repeated requests for such from residents to the city president, Wojciech Szczurek.

==== Road transport ====
Trasa Kwiatkowskiego links Port of Gdynia and the city with Obwodnica Trójmiejska, and therefore A1 motorway. National road 6 connects Tricity with Słupsk, Koszalin and Szczecin agglomeration.

==== Railways ====
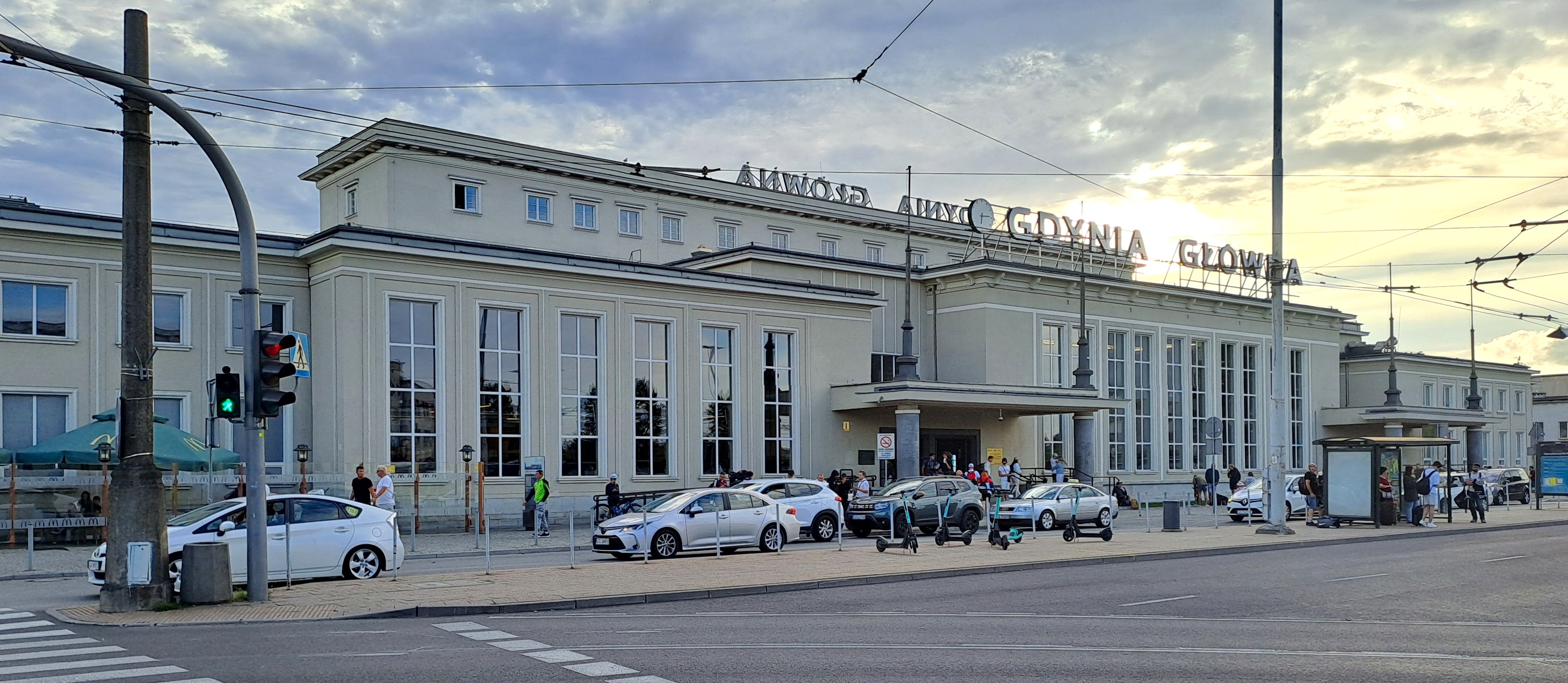
Gdynia Główna, the city's main railway station

The principal station in Gdynia is Gdynia Główna railway station, the busiest railway station in the Tricity and northern Poland and sixth busiest in Poland overall, serving 13,41 mln passengers in 2022. Gdynia has eleven railway stations. Local train services are provided by the 'Fast Urban Railway,' Szybka Kolej Miejska (Tricity) operating frequent trains covering the Tricity area including Gdańsk, Sopot and Gdynia. Long-distance trains from Warsaw via Gdańsk terminate at Gdynia, and there are direct trains to Szczecin, Poznań, Katowice, Lublin and other major cities. In 2011-2015 the Warsaw-Gdańsk-Gdynia route was undergoing a major upgrading costing $3 billion, partly funded by the European Investment Bank, including track replacement, realignment of curves and relocation of sections of track to allow speeds up to 200 km/h (124 mph), modernization of stations, and installation of the most modern ETCS signalling system, which was completed in June 2015. In December 2014 new Alstom Pendolino high-speed trains were put into service between Gdynia, Warsaw and Kraków reducing rail travel times to Gdynia by 2 hours.

=== Economy ===
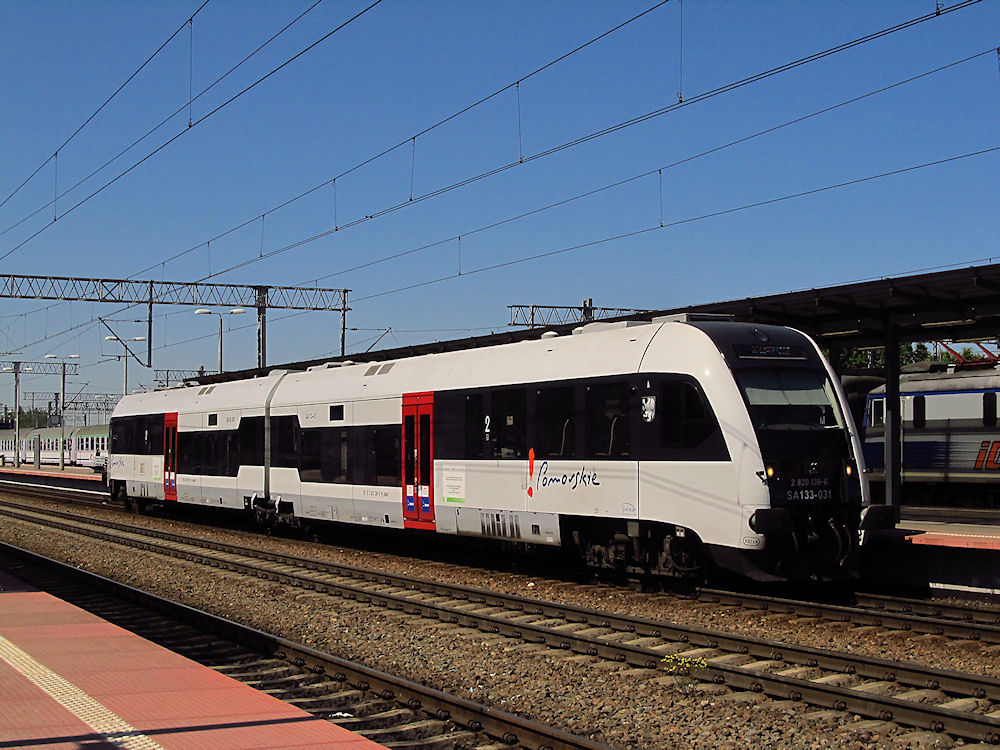
Pesa Atribo SA133 of the Tricity Fast Urban Railways (SKM) departing from Gdynia

Notable companies that have their headquarters or regional offices in Gdynia:

- PROKOM SA – the largest Polish I.T. company
- C. Hartwig Gdynia SA – one of the largest Polish freight forwarders
- Sony Pictures – finance centre
- Thomson Reuters – business data provider
- Vistal – bridge constructions, offshore and shipbuilding markets; partially located on old Stocznia Gdynia terrains
- Nauta – ship repair yard; partially located on old Stocznia Gdynia terrains
- Crist – shipbuilding, offshore constructions, steel structures, sea engineering, civil engineering; located on old Stocznia Gdynia terrains

Former:

- Stocznia Gdynia – former largest Polish shipyard, now under bankruptcy procedures
- Nordea – banks, sold and consolidated with PKO bank

== Education ==
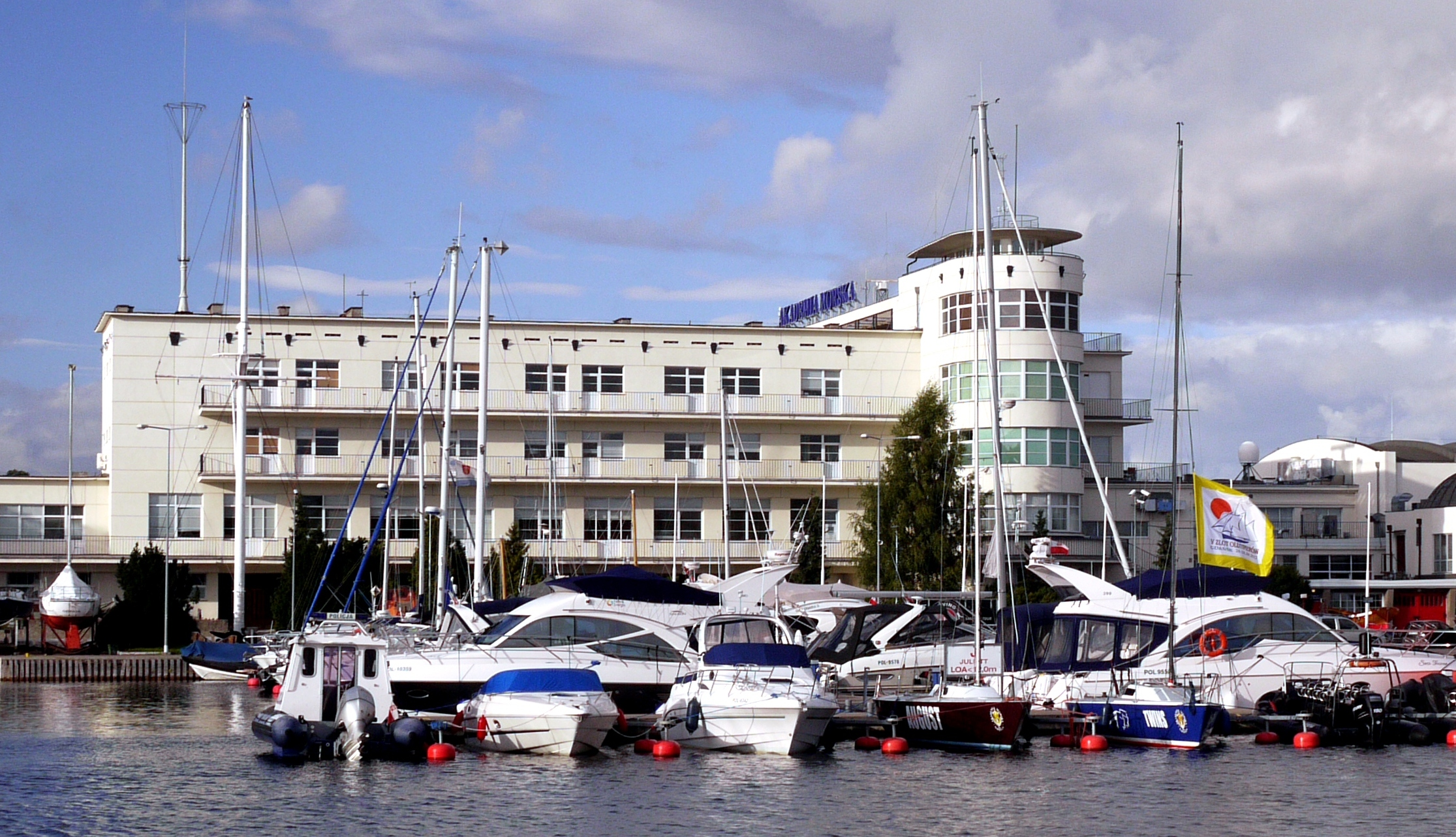
Gdynia Maritime University, Faculty of Navigation

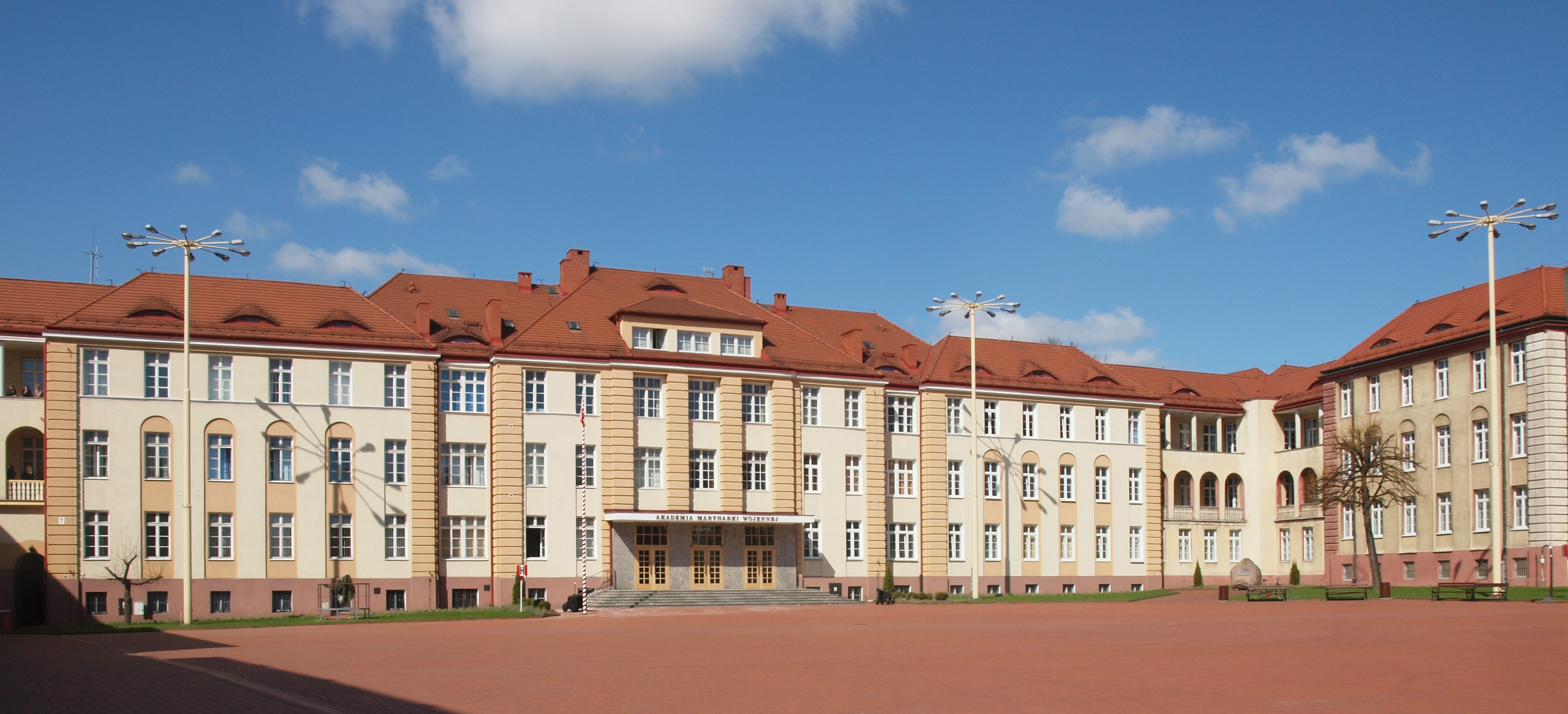
Polish Naval Academy

There are currently 8 universities and institutions of higher education based in Gdynia. Many students from Gdynia also attend universities located in the Tricity.

- State-owned:
  - Gdynia Maritime University
  - Polish Naval Academy
- Privately owned:
  - WSB Merito Universities – WSB Merito University in Gdańsk, departments of Economics and Management
  - Academy of International Economic and Political Relations
  - University of Business and Administration in Gdynia
  - Pomeranian Higher School of Humanities
  - Cardinal Stefan Wyszyński University – department in Gdynia
  - Higher School of Social Communication

== Military ==
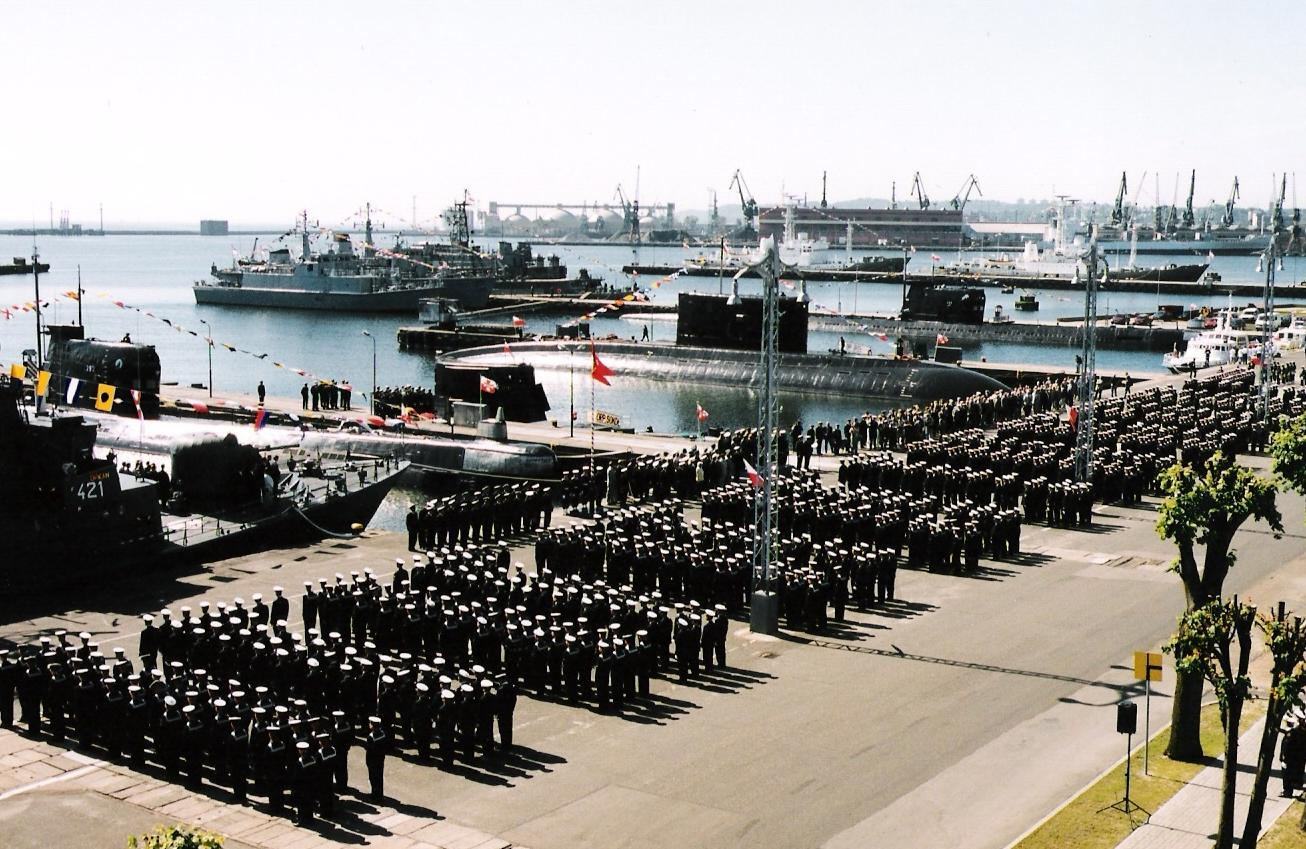
Gdynia-Oksywie Naval Base

Gdynia port is the home of 3rd Ship Flotilla of the Polish Navy. Beside the Polish Naval Academy in Gdynia is the 6. Ośrodek Radioelektroniczny (6. electronic surveillance station) of the Polish Navy. The Navy has receiving stations along the Polish shoreline, especially in the Gdańsk Bay and on the border of Russian Kaliningrad. The data is proceeded at Gdynia station. The Polish SIGINT ships Jerzy Różycki and Hendryk Zygalsky, have their homeport in Gdynia.

== Notable people ==
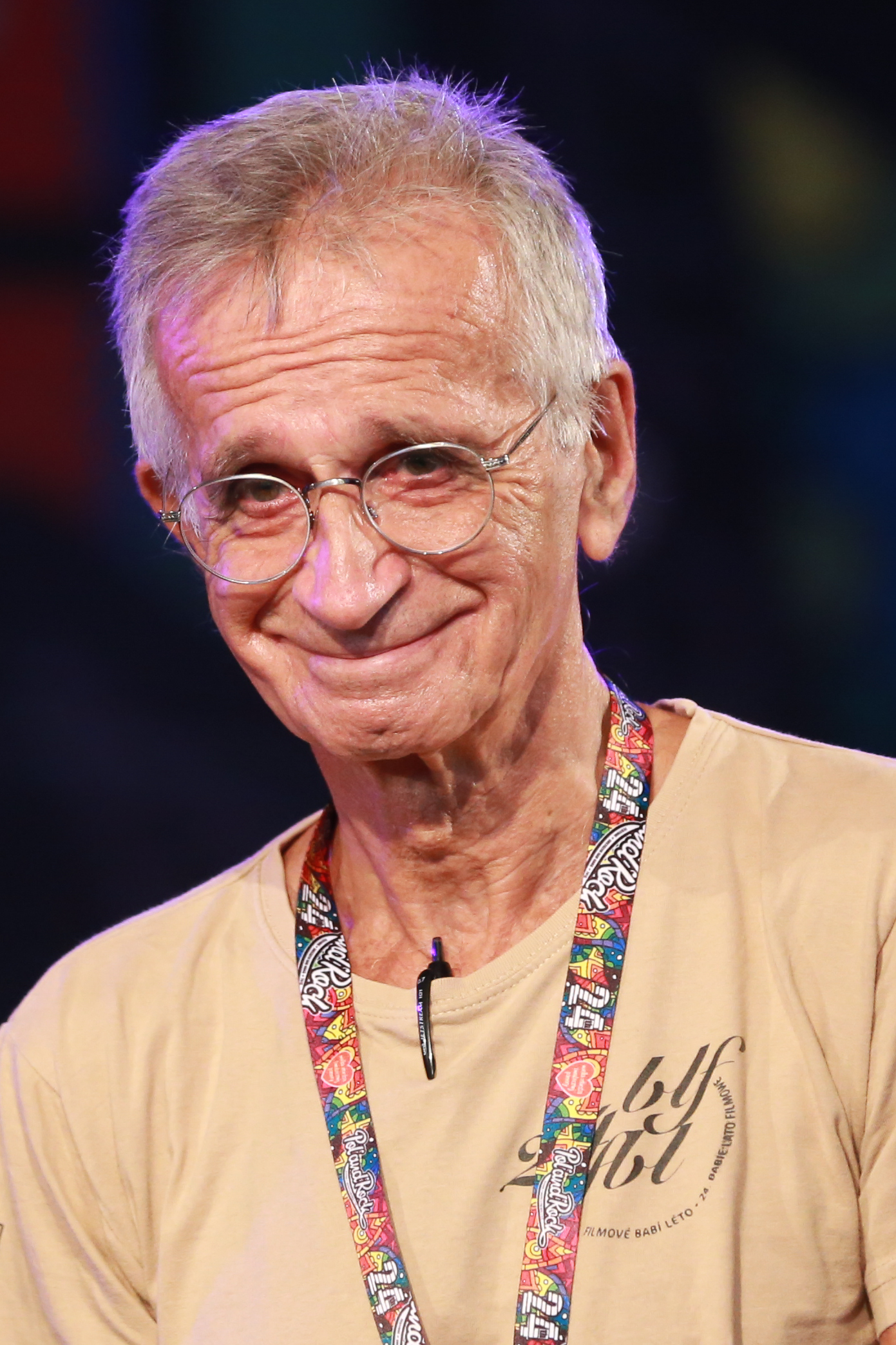
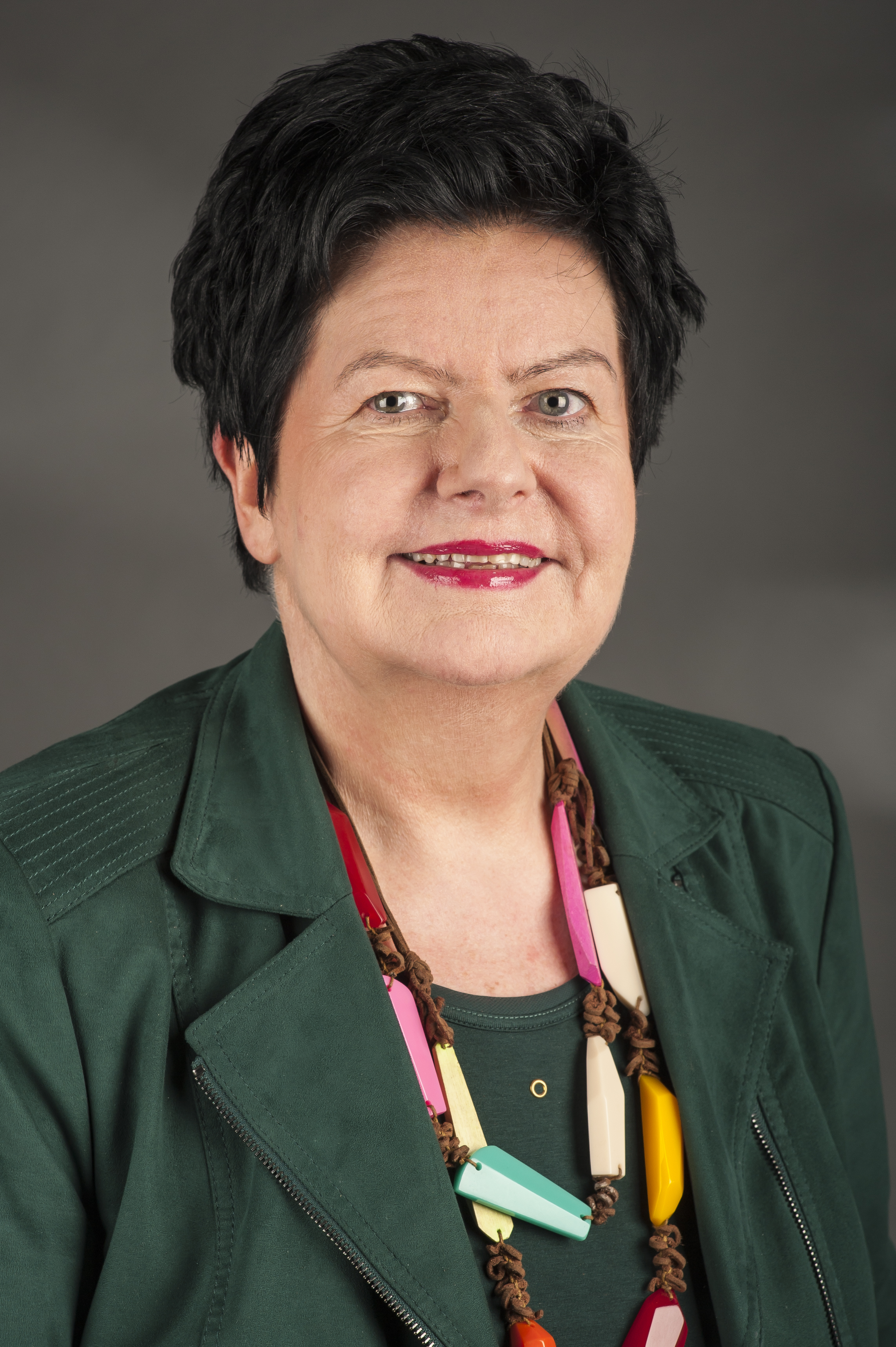
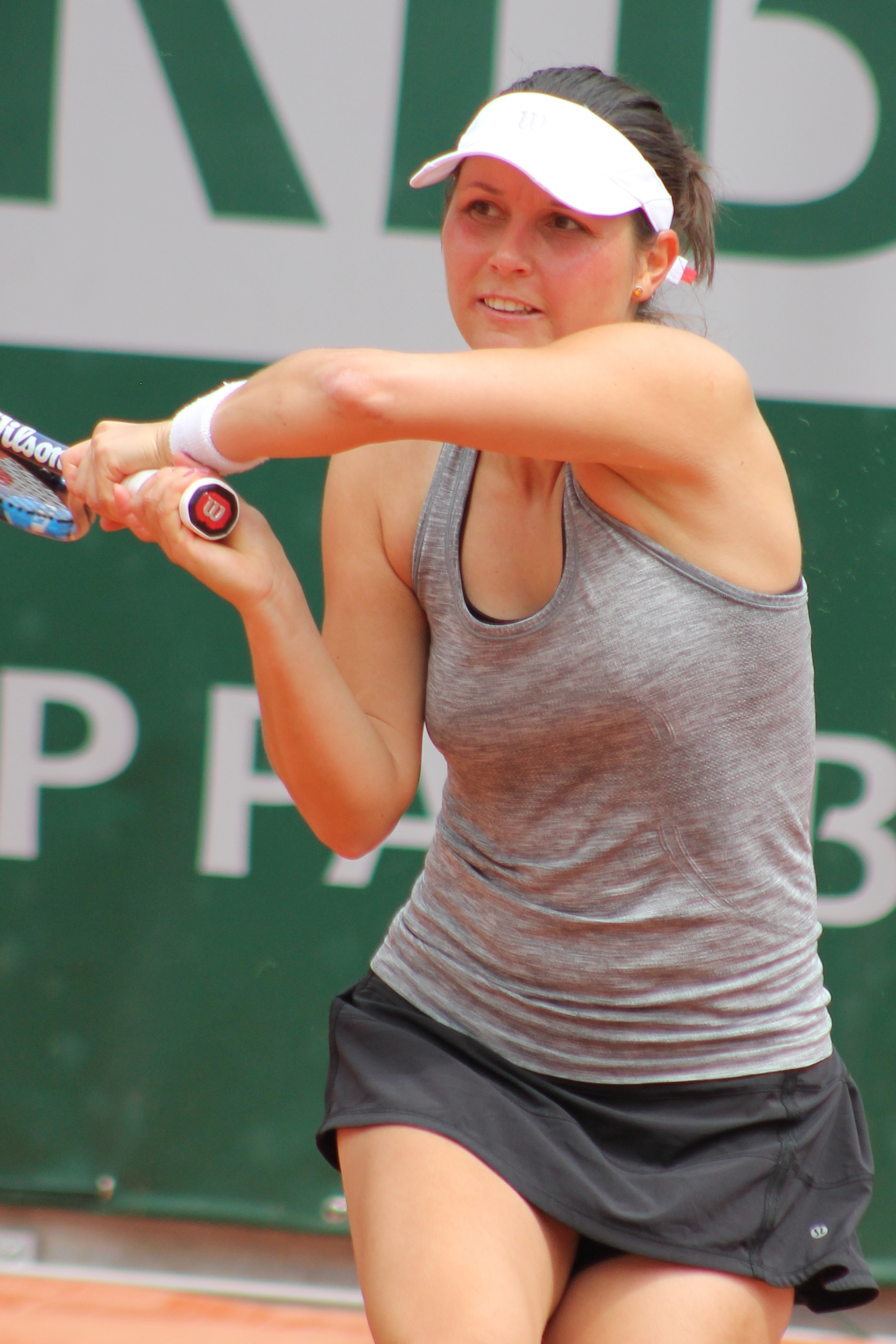
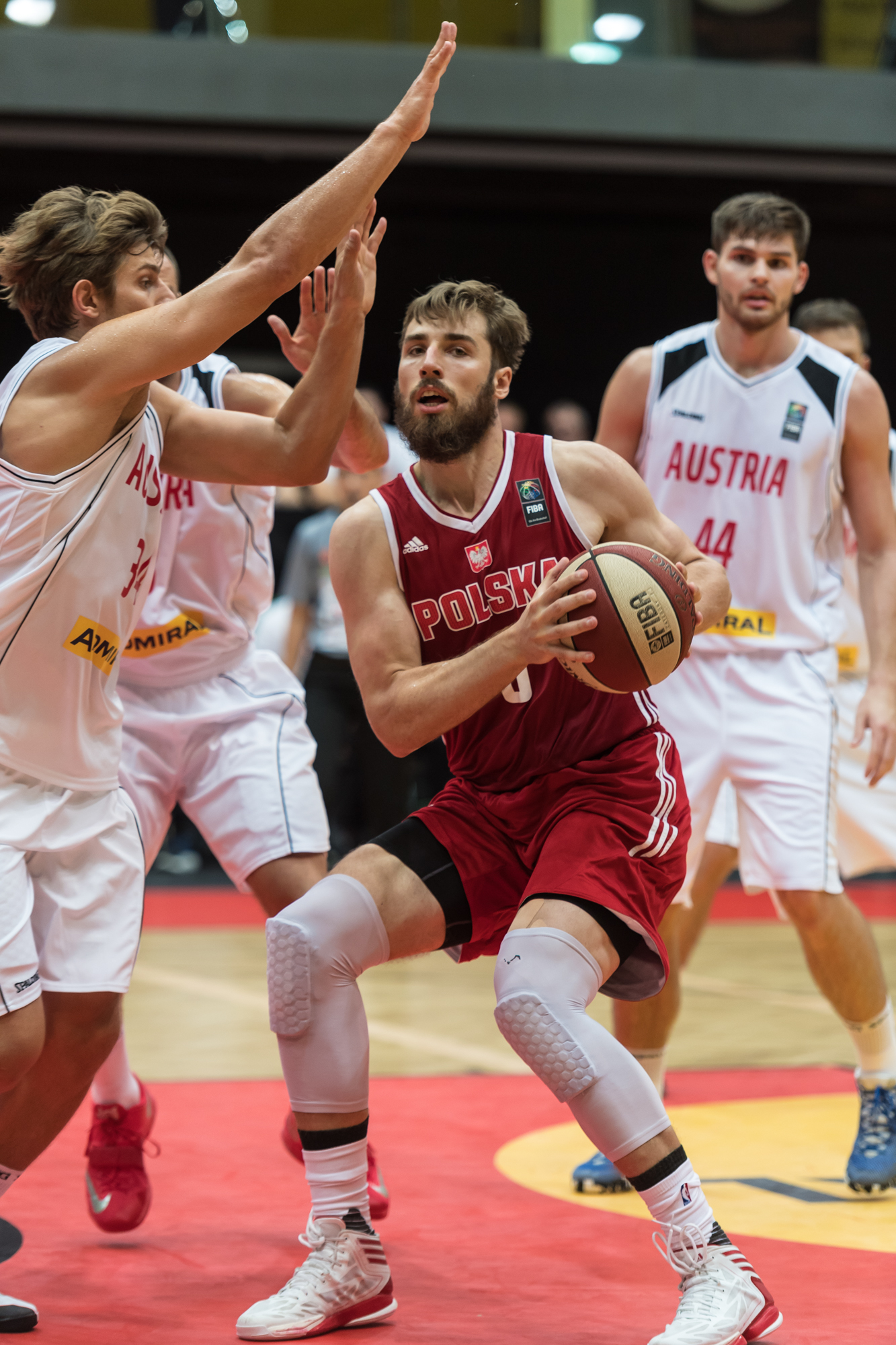
Prominent people from Gdynia, clockwise from upper left: Jacek Fedorowicz, Joanna Senyszyn, Klaudia Jans-Ignacik and Olek Czyż
- Stanisław Baranowski (1935–1978), glaciologist, undertook scientific expeditions to Spitsbergen and Antarctica
- Karol Olgierd Borchardt (1905–1986), writer and captain of the Polish Merchant Marine
- Krzysztof Charamsa (born 1972), former Catholic theologian and author
- Zbigniew Ciesielski (1934–2020), mathematician
- Adam Darski (born 1977), musician and TV personality, frontman for the blackened death metal band Behemoth
- Wiesław Dawidowski (born 1964), Augustinian Catholic priest, doctor of theology and journalist
- Rafał de Weryha-Wysoczański (born 1975), art historian, genealogist and writer
- Jacek Fedorowicz (born 1937), satirist and actor
- Tova Friedman (born 1938), therapist, social worker, author and Holocaust survivor
- Eugeniusz Geno Małkowski (1942–2016), painter
- Gunnar Heinsohn (born 1943), German author, sociologist and economist
- Klaus Hurrelmann (born 1944), Professor of Public Health and Education
- Piotr Indyk, Polish-American theoretical computer scientist
- Hilary Jastak (1914–2000 in Gdynia), Catholic priest, Doctor of Theology, Chaplain of Solidarity movement, Major of Polish Armed Forces, Lieutenant Commander of the Polish Navy
- Jan Kaczkowski (1977–2016), Roman Catholic priest, doctor of theological sciences, bioethicist, vlogger, organizer, and director of the Puck Hospice
- Janusz Kaczmarek (born 1961), lawyer, prosecutor and politician
- Aleksandra Kosiorek (born 1985), politician and jurist, mayor of Gdynia since 2024
- Marcin Kupinski (born 1983), ballet dancer
- Tomasz Makowiecki (born 1983), musician, singer and songwriter
- Dorota Nieznalska (born 1973), visual artist and sculptor
- Kazimierz Ostrowski (1917–1999 in Gdynia), painter
- Anna Przybylska (1978–2014), actress and model
- Zvi Aryeh Rosenfeld (1922–1978), Polish-American rabbi and educator
- Jerzy Rubach (born 1948), Polish and American linguist who specializes in phonology
- Arkadiusz Rybicki (1953–2010), politician, active in the Solidarity movement
- Joanna Senyszyn (born 1949), left-wing politician, vice-president of the Democratic Left Alliance (SLD) and MEP
- Anna Siewierska (1955–2011), Polish-born linguist, specialist in language typology
- Mirosław Śledź (born 1961), painter known for quadrism, a Cubism-inspired style
- Wojciech Szczurek (born 1963), Mayor of the City of Gdynia since 1998
- Józef Unrug (1884–1973), German-born Polish vice admiral who helped create the Polish navy
- Marian Zacharski (born 1951), Intelligence officer convicted of espionage
- Marek Żukowski (born 1952), theoretical physicist, specializes in quantum mechanics

=== Sport ===
- Jörg Berger (1944–2010), German soccer player, trainer
- Małgorzata Białecka (born 1988), windsurfer, competed at 2016 Summer Olympics
- Józef Błaszczyk (born 1947), sailor who competed in the 1972 Summer Olympics
- Andrzej Bledzewski (born 1977), retired football goalkeeper, over 400 pro games
- Karolina Chlewińska (born 1983), foil fencer, competed at the 2008 Summer Olympics
- Andrzej Chudziński (1948–1995), swimmer, competed in three events at the 1972 Summer Olympics
- Olek Czyż (born 1990), professional basketball player, played for Poland
- Adriana Dadci (born 1979), judoka, competed at the 2004 Summer Olympics
- Tomasz Dawidowski (born 1978), footballer, over 200 pro games and 10 for Poland
- Maciej Grabowski (born 1978), laser class sailor, competed in the 2000, 2004 and 2008 Summer Olympics
- Piotr Hallmann (born 1987), mixed martial artist, second lieutenant in the Polish Navy
- Igor Janik (born 1983), javelin thrower, competed in the 2008 and 2012 Summer Olympics
- Klaudia Jans-Ignacik (born 1984), retired tennis player, competed in the 2008 and 2012 Summer Olympics
- Michael Klim (born 1977), Polish-born Australian swimmer, Olympic gold medallist and world champion
- Stefan Liv (1980–2011), Polish-born Swedish professional ice hockey goaltender
- Ryszard Marczak (born 1945), former long-distance runner from Poland, competed in the marathon at the 1980 Summer Olympics
- Marcin Mięciel (born 1975), soccer player, over 500 pro games
- Joanna Mitrosz (born 1988), rhythmic gymnast, competed at the 2008 and 2012 Summer Olympics
- Adelajda Mroske (1944–1975), speed skater, she competed in four events at the 1964 Winter Olympics
- Justyna Plutowska (born 1991), ice dancer
- Monika Pyrek (born 1980), retired pole vaulter, competed at the 2000, 2004 2008 and 2012 Summer Olympics
- Teresa Remiszewska (1928–2002), Solo ocean yacht sailor
- Jarosław Rodzewicz (born 1973), fencer, won a silver medal in the team foil event at the 1996 Summer Olympics
- Anna Rogowska (born 1981), pole vaulter, the bronze medallist at the 2004 Summer Olympics
- Anna Rybicka (born 1977), fencer, she won a silver medal in the women's team foil event at the 2000 Summer Olympics
- Anna Sobczak (born 1967), fencer, competed in the women's individual and team foil events at the 1988 and 1992 Summer Olympics
- Tomasz Sokołowski (born 1970), footballer, over 350 pro games and 12 for Poland
- Michał Zych (born 1982), ice dancer

=== Fictional characters ===
- Ernst Stavro Blofeld (born 28 May 1908 in Gdingen), fictional character and villain from the James Bond series of novels and films, created by Ian Fleming

== International relations ==
=== Consulates ===
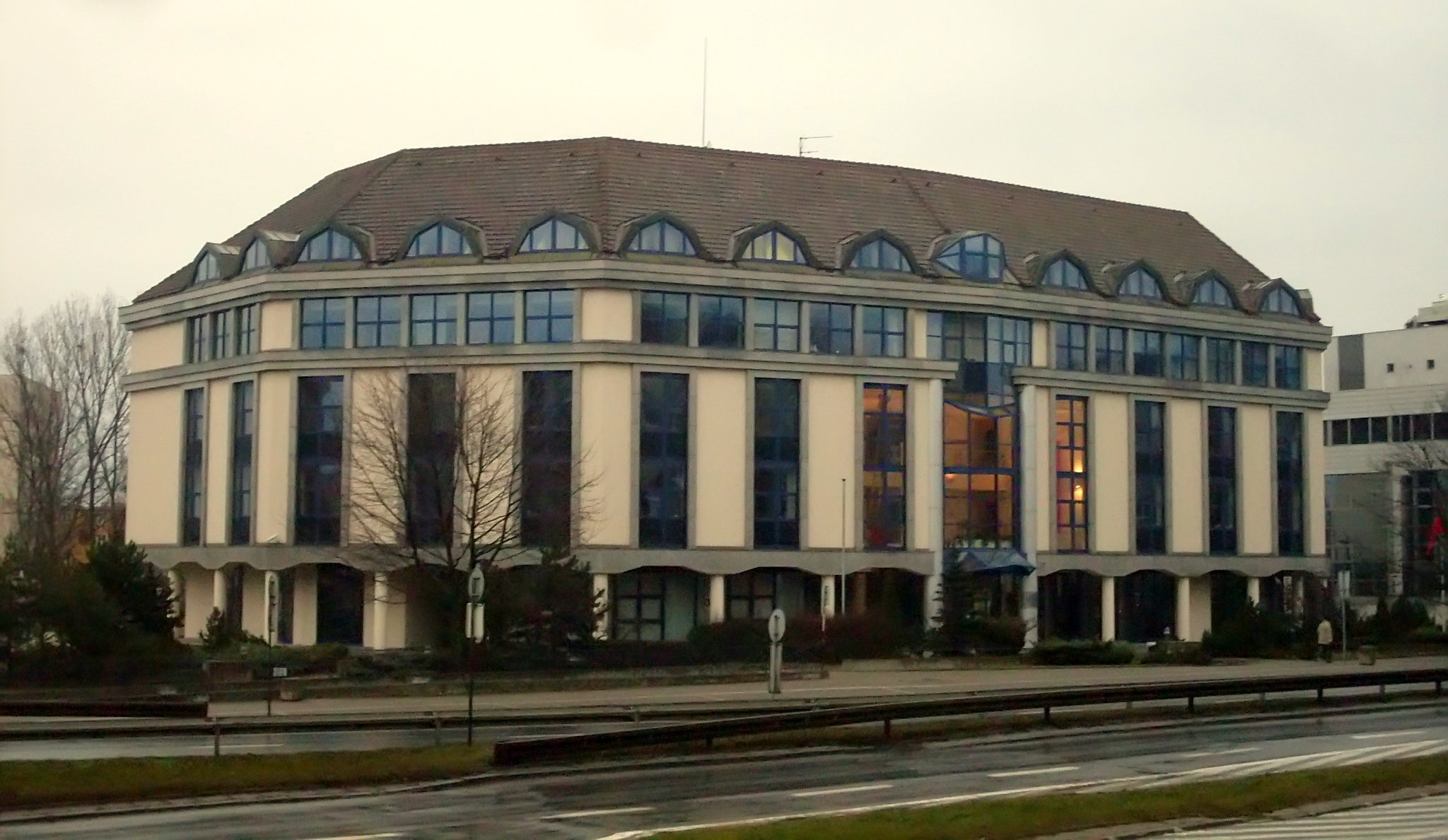
Building hosting the Honorary Consulate of Norway

There are 10 honorary consulates in Gdynia – Belgium, Chile, Cyprus, Denmark, Finland, France, Italy, Luxembourg, Malta, Norway.

=== Twin towns – sister cities ===
Gdynia is twinned with:

- Aalborg, Denmark
- Baranavichy, Belarus
- Brooklyn (New York), United States
- Busan, South Korea
- Côte d'Opale (communauté), France
- Haikou, China
- Karlskrona, Sweden
- Kiel, Germany
- Klaipėda, Lithuania
- Kotka, Finland
- Kristiansand, Norway
- Kunda (Viru-Nigula), Estonia
- Liepāja, Latvia
- Plymouth, England, United Kingdom
- Seattle, United States
- Kaohsiung, Taiwan
- Kherson, Ukraine

Former twin towns:

- Kaliningrad, Russia (terminated in 2022 due to the Russian invasion of Ukraine)

== See also ==
- Gdynia trolleybus
- Ports of the Baltic Sea
- St. Anthony parish, Gdynia
- Wiczlino, Gdynia
