= Culture in post-communist Poland =

With the fall of communism Polish culture and society began a process of profound transformation, marked by the return of democracy and redevelopment of civil society. After 1989, the heavy government controls ended, and radical economic changes were introduced. The influx of new aesthetic and social ideas was accompanied by the Western market forces. However, unlike any other temporal marker in the development of Polish culture from the past, the year 1989 did not introduce any specific literary events or artistic manifestations. For a generation of accomplished writers the objectives and their moral quests remained the same as in the preceding period. The first decade of freedom brought mainly state reforms in the financing of cultural institutions and patronage; forcing self-sustainability in an often uncharted territory. Literature, film, visual arts, theater and mass media remained focused on their active participation in public life.

== Historical background ==
Polish literature includes many famous poets and writers concerned with issues pertinent to the present: Jan Kochanowski, Adam Mickiewicz, Bolesław Prus, Juliusz Słowacki, Witold Gombrowicz, Stanisław Lem and Ryszard Kapuściński. Writers Henryk Sienkiewicz, Władysław Reymont, Czesław Miłosz, and Wisława Szymborska have each won the Nobel Prize for Literature.

The events that shaped Polish culture at the onset of the post-communist period began in 1976. The suppressed demonstrations of 1976 gave rise to underground publishing on an unprecedented scale. It was the true beginning of a new literary knowledge in Poland. Between 1976 and 1989, the so-called Drugi obieg (the Second circulation, term commonly applied to Poland's illegal press during the military Coup d'état), published the staggering 5,000 regular newsletters and full-size periodicals including some 7,000 books.

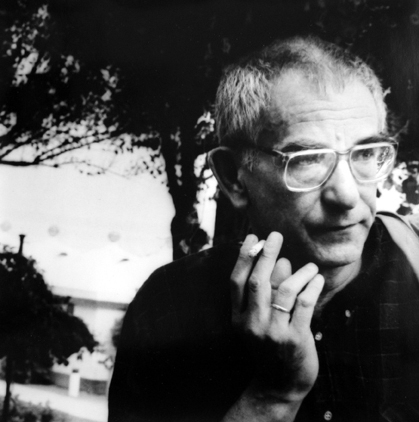
Krzysztof Kieślowski at the Venice Film Festival, 1994

The 1978 papal election of Pope John Paul II has had an equally profound impact on the society. Two years later, the blacklisted Czesław Miłosz was awarded the Nobel Prize in Literature, and the Solidarity movement was born following a wave of mass strikes against totalitarianism, poverty, and austerity measures. Almost every Polish artist and writer took part in the movement, and – in one form or another – suffered the consequences of the military crackdown of December 1981. After that – as in the films of Krzysztof Kieślowski (No End, 1985; Dekalog, 1989) – the merely physical existence was no longer bearable. Meanwhile, the underground press flourished, supported financially through generous donations from the West, and the inquiries into the nature of law and morality continued. Russia did not intervene in the matter, when their former satellite state was legally dissolved in 1990.

The period 1976–1989 provided the necessary intellectual and aesthetic base on which the Polish postmodernism was founded in the arts and literature, partly inspired by the widely popular works of Witkacy, Witold Gombrowicz and Karol Irzykowski. The transitions which began in the 1990s continued throughout the early 21st century.

== Popular media ==
World-renowned Polish movie directors include Academy Awards winners Roman Polanski, Andrzej Wajda, Zbigniew Rybczyński, Janusz Kamiński and, Krzysztof Kieślowski.

The Polish avant-garde theatre is world-famous, with Jerzy Grotowski as its most innovative and creative representative. One of the most original twentieth-century theatre personalities was Tadeusz Kantor, painter, theoretician of drama, stage designer, and playwright, his ideas finding their culmination in the theatre of death and his most recognised production being "Umarła klasa" (Dead Class).

There is no strict division in Poland between theatre and film actors, therefore many stage artists are known to viewers the world over, for instance from the films of Andrzej Wajda (e.g., Wojciech Pszoniak, Daniel Olbrychski, Krystyna Janda, Jerzy Radziwiłowicz) or Krzysztof Kieślowski (Jerzy Stuhr, Janusz Gajos).

== Music ==
Portrait of the Varsovian hip-hop duo Trials X, 1994

The traditional Polish music composers include world-renowned pianist Frédéric Chopin as well as famous composers such as Krzysztof Penderecki, Henryk Mikołaj Górecki, Karol Szymanowski among others. Influenced by Polish folklore, the music of Fryderyk Chopin conveys the essence of Polish Romanticism. Since 1927, the International Frederick Chopin Piano Competition has been held every five years in Warsaw.

Between the wars, a group of composers formed the Association of Young Polish Musicians which included Grażyna Bacewicz, Zygmunt Mycielski, and Tadeusz Szeligowski.

Following World War II, some composers, such as Roman Palester and Andrzej Panufnik, fled the country and remained in the exile. In 1945 the Polish Composers' Union was established, and it has endured into the decades following the transition from communism. In the early 1960s, a number of composers known as the Polish School arose, characterized by the use of sonorism and dodecaphonism. The style emerged from the political crisis in 1956, following Stalin's death; that same year saw the Warsaw Autumn music festival inaugurated, from whence came additional popularity for the Polish School. Composers included Tadeusz Baird, Bogusław Schaeffer, Włodzimierz Kotoński, Witold Szalonek, Krzysztof Penderecki, Witold Lutosławski, Wojciech Kilar, Kazimierz Serocki and Henryk Mikołaj Górecki.

Modern-day composers include Krzysztof Meyer, Paweł Szymański, Krzesimir Dębski, Hanna Kulenty, Eugeniusz Knapik and Paweł Mykietyn.

Poland has always been a very open country to new music genres and even before the fall of the communism, music styles like rock, metal, jazz, electronic, polka and new wave were well known. Since 1989, the Polish scene has exploded with new talents and a more diverse style. Contrary to most European countries, pop music is not dominant in Poland.

Every year, a huge gathering of young Poles meet to celebrate the rock and alternative music in Jarocin or Żary. These events often attract more than 250,000 people and are comparable to the gatherings in Woodstock and Roskilde. Two contemporary big Polish music festivals are Opole Festival and Sopot Festival. Poland has a very active underground extreme metal music scene. Some of the bands that have heralded and helped the cause are Vader, Behemoth, Decapitated, Graveland, and Dissenter. This has paved ground for a large underground movement. One of the biggest record labels of death metal in Poland is Empire Records.

In jazz music, Polish musicians created a specific style, which was most famous in 1960s and 1970s. Most famous Polish jazz artists include Krzysztof Komeda, Adam Makowicz, Tomasz Stańko, Michał Urbaniak and Urszula Dudziak.

== Museums and festivals ==
Interior of the Emigration Museum in Gdynia

Poland offers a large spectrum of cultural experience, including music festivals like Wratislavia Cantans and the Warsaw Autumn. Polish museums often exhibit art collections - paintings including Leonardo da Vinci's Lady with an Ermine at the Czartoryski Museum in Kraków; the Veit Stoss High Altar in St. Mary's Basilica, Kraków; and the Last Judgement by Hans Memling (The National Museum in Gdańsk). Ethnographic museums and open-air sightseeing museums also hold collections. The panorama of Polish culture is completed by a medley of local festivals.

== Cuisine ==
A fast food outlet in Poznań advertising kebab, gyros, and flaki

With the end of pro-Soviet totalitarianism in Poland, new restaurants opened and the basic foodstuffs were once again easily obtainable. This led to a gradual return of rich traditional Polish cuisine, both in home cooking and in restaurants. At the same time, restaurants and supermarkets promoted the use of ingredients typical of other cuisines of the world. Notable foods in Polish cuisine include kiełbasa, borscht, pierogi, flaczki (tripe soup), gołąbki, oscypek, Polish pork chops, bigos, various potato dishes, a fast food sandwich zapiekanka, and many more. Traditional Polish desserts include Polish doughnuts, Polish gingerbread and many similar others.

== Sports ==
Many sports are popular in Poland. Football (soccer) is the country's most popular sport, with a rich history of international competition. Track & field, basketball, boxing, fencing, handball, ice hockey, swimming, volleyball, and weightlifting are other popular sports. The first Polish Formula One driver, Robert Kubica, has brought awareness of Formula One Racing to Poland. Poland has made a distinctive mark in motorcycle speedway racing thanks to Tomasz Gollob, a highly successful Polish rider. The Polish mountains are an ideal venue for hiking, skiing and mountain biking and attract millions of tourists every year from all over the world. Baltic beaches and resorts are popular locations for fishing, canoeing, kayaking and a broad-range of other water-themed sports.

== See also ==
- Society of Poland
