= Peterswald =

Peterswald may refer to:

- Peterswald, the German name for Petrovice (Ústí nad Labem District), a village in Ústí nad Labem District, Czech Republic
- Peterswald, the German name for Petřvald (Karviná District), a town in Karviná District, Czech Republic
- William John Peterswald, South Australian Commissioner of Police
