= Kurlana Tapa Youth Justice Centre =

Youth detention facility in Cavan, South Australia

Kurlana Tapa Youth Justice Centre Kurlana Tapa
- Interactive map of Kurlana Tapa Youth Justice Centre; Kurlana Tapa
- Location: Cavan; 34.8222°S 138.6014°E Jonal Drive; 34.8281°S 138.6027°E Goldsborough Road
- Status: Operational
- Capacity: 36 (Jonal Drive); 60 (Goldsborough Road)
- Opened: 1993 (Jonal Drive); 2012 (Goldsborough Road)
- Managed by: South Australian Department of Human Services

Kurlana Tapa Youth Justice Centre (also known as Adelaide Youth Training Centre or Kurlana Tapa – "New Path") is a youth detention centre at two campuses in Cavan, an industrial northern suburb of Adelaide, South Australia. It is operated by the Government of South Australia Department of Human Services, unlike adult prisons which are operated by the Department for Correctional Services. It is the only dedicated youth detention centre in South Australia.

== History ==
Jonal Drive campus came into operation in 1993. Subsequently, the Goldsborough Road site was established in 2012 and replaced the Magill Youth Training Centre. The remaining residents in Jonal Drive campus was transferred to Goldsborough Road campus in August 2019.

== Treatment of residents ==
The Kurlana Tapa Youth Justice Centre has come under scrutiny multiple times since beginning operations due to allegations of failing to provide adequate care to its residents. In 2019, a report from the Committee on the Rights of the Child highlighted that Australia's youth services are deficient in resources and can potentially harm the young individuals they are meant to safeguard. A 2020 South Australian Ombudsman report found that a youth was detained in solitary confinement like conditions for more than 22 hours per day for five consecutive days. It was also reported that the centre had "inadequate" staffing and resourcing which led to children held there denied access to education, phone calls to lawyers and medical treatment. In 2023, reports surfaced once more about conditions resembling solitary confinement taking place at the facility. Despite acceptance of the report presented in the Parliament, the issues continued through till 2023.

== Campus ==
=== Jonal Drive campus ===
The Jonal Drive campus came into operation in 1993. It housed males aged between 10 and 14 years, and females aged between 10 and 20 years until August 2019, when the remaining inmates were transferred to Goldsborough Road. This was to initially be a six-month trial with the Jonal Drive facility retained and available if additional capacity is required, It has a capacity of 36 beds.

=== Goldsborough Road campus ===
The Goldsborough Road campus was established in 2012 and replaced the Magill Youth Training Centre. It has a capacity of 60 beds. In August 2019, the remaining residents at Jonal Drive Campus were transferred to here.
