= John Formby =

Australian shipping agent

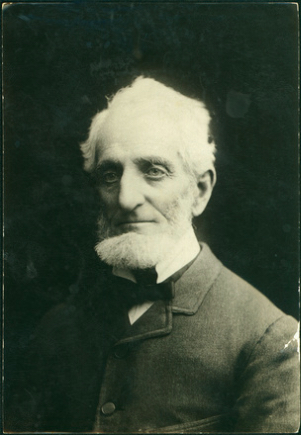

Mayor of Port Adelaide
- In office 1869–1871

Chairman of the Port Adelaide Football Club
- In office 1880–1892

Personal details
- Born: 18 August 1819 Liverpool, England
- Died: 30 September 1906 (aged 87) Alberton, South Australia

John Formby (18 August 1819 – 30 September 1906) was a shipping agent of Port Adelaide, South Australia. He was mayor of Port Adelaide for three years 1869–1871 and chairman of the Port Adelaide Football Club 1880–1892.

== History ==
Formby was born in Liverpool, England, to John Formby and Helen Formby, née Harper, of Maghull, near Liverpool.

At some early age he left England for Tasmania, and three years later arrived at Port Adelaide from Hobart in a 40-ton schooner in 1840 with his younger brother William Harper Formby, and by 1841 they were raising livestock in the Little Para area.

It is likely his brother returned to Britain with a list of goods needed in the new colony, commodities which could readily be sold at a good profit. In May 1843 the brig Davidsons arrived at Port Adelaide with W. H. Formby in the cabin, and a great quantity of merchandise in the hold. Those goods which were not immediately sold were freighted by Davidsons to Hobart Town. Passengers in the cabin included Mr H. Formby, Mr E. Formby, Mr and Mrs Hall, Mr and Mrs Fairchild, Mrs Evans, Mr and Mrs Brooks, and Alexander Stewart, who may have been destined for Hobart, Sydney or Liverpool. Formby then returned to Britain, and for four years gained sailing experience shipping between the East and West Indies, Ceylon and India. He returned to Australia with a large schooner, which he sold in Tasmania. He then returned to South Australia, settling at Port Adelaide. He married in 1848.

Like his brother, he was a devotee of the racetrack. He was secretary of the South Australian Jockey Club to 1853, quitting when he moved to Port Adelaide. In 1854 a steeplechase scratch match was held between Formby's Honesty and his brother's Duke of Wellington. He was a judge of bloodstock at most Agricultural and Horticultural Society shows from 1858 to 1876 He was in business as a shipping agent, and was highly regarded as shipper of livestock, especially horses. His technique of shipping two horses together in a loose box resulted in fewer casualties than any other shipper. Pairing of the animals had a calming effect, and allowed for some exercise: some horses developed a system where one would lay down while the other stood.

He was instrumental in the foundation of the District Council of Queenstown and Alberton. His name was put forward for mayor of Port Adelaide in 1866 but he declined to nominate. After a similar deputation in 1869 he acceded, confessing that he would not be able to fill the position as effectively as his predecessor, J. M. Sinclair. It was during this period that the Formby Parade and Formby Steps (Note: A. T. Saunders reckoned John Formby and Henry W. Thompson were the two best mayors of Port Adelaide: Sinclair he considered was the puppet of a clique of businessmen.) were completed as well as the North Parade. He was elected to the South Australian Chamber of Commerce in 1867.

In 1869 he was appointed Warden of the Marine Board. He promoted Port Adelaide as one of the finest and safest harbours in he world, and defended the Harbor Board's decision to dredge the second bar, allowing ships to come and go without reference to the tide.

Formby was remembered as:

John Formby, tall and spare, with an eagle eye, and an admiral's nose, was a typical Portonian, charged with an invaluable sea experience and brimming over with sea stories. He was a plain and practical man, but a dogged fighter. Among the traditions of the Port was a controversy he had with the late Canon Green concerning ritualism. I remember that the Central Board of Health served a notice upon him to abate a nuisance, and he was prepared with evidence to show that no nuisance existed. He resisted the board from court to court, and spent hundreds of pounds by way of protest against official tyranny when compliance would have cost but a few shillings. Though technically defeated ultimately he remained unconvinced, and certainly he won a moral victory, for the board succeeded on the dictum that its fiat that a nuisance existed was final, and that evidence to the contrary, though conclusive, could not count. Mr Formby was a sailor, a business man, and a farmer, in addition to which he became Mayor, president of the Marine Board, stipendiary and special magistrate, and returning officer. And every part he played with ability and scrupulous care. He was never tired of showing how the Clyde had been dredged from a shallow stream to carry the largest shipping up to Glasgow, and what had been done to improve the Mersey for the benefit of his native city, Liverpool. He was a consistent advocate of making the inner harbor the sole harbor the mail steamers, and he would have rejoiced to have seen the magnificent fleet now at the wharfs as a fulfilment of his best dreams. Like Henry Thompson and Sir Samuel Davenport he was a fine, self-reliant, versatile colonist, who deserved the grand name of an English gentleman who regarded honor as the test of character, and who delighted in public duty, but detested self-advertising.

His shipping business became John Formby & Son with the admission in 1873 of his son Edward, who took over sometime around 1875, but was put out of business by competition from John Turnbull.

He died at his residence in Alberton.

== Other interests ==
- Formby was a synodsman, St Paul's (Anglican) cathedral, Port Adelaide
- He was president of the Port Adelaide Cricket Club in 1865
- He was appointed Justice of the Peace in 1867.

He was appointed Stipendiary Magistrate in 1889 and Special Magistrate

== Recognition ==
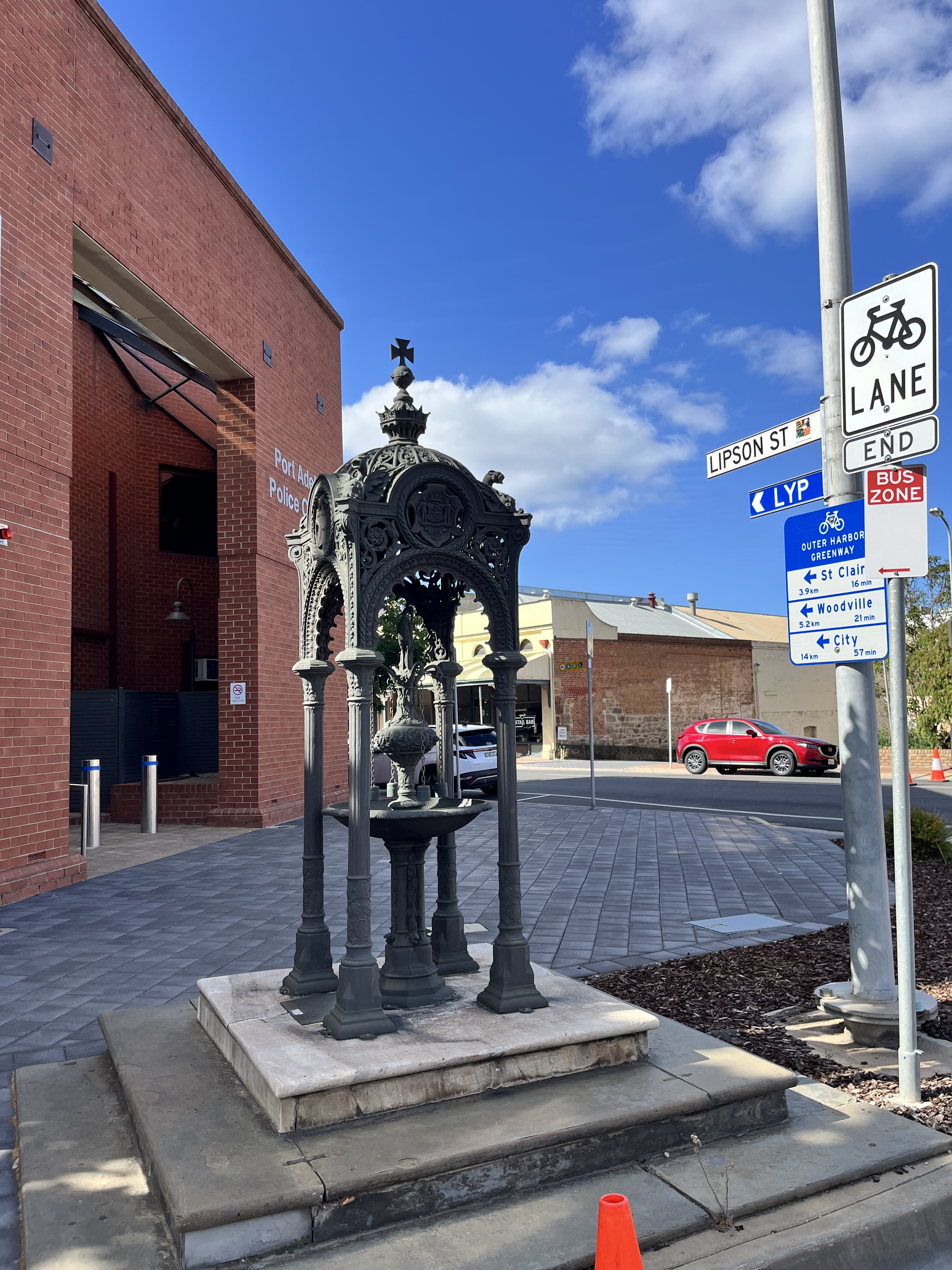
John Formby Memorial Fountain, corner of Lipson Street and St Vincent Street, Port Adelaide.

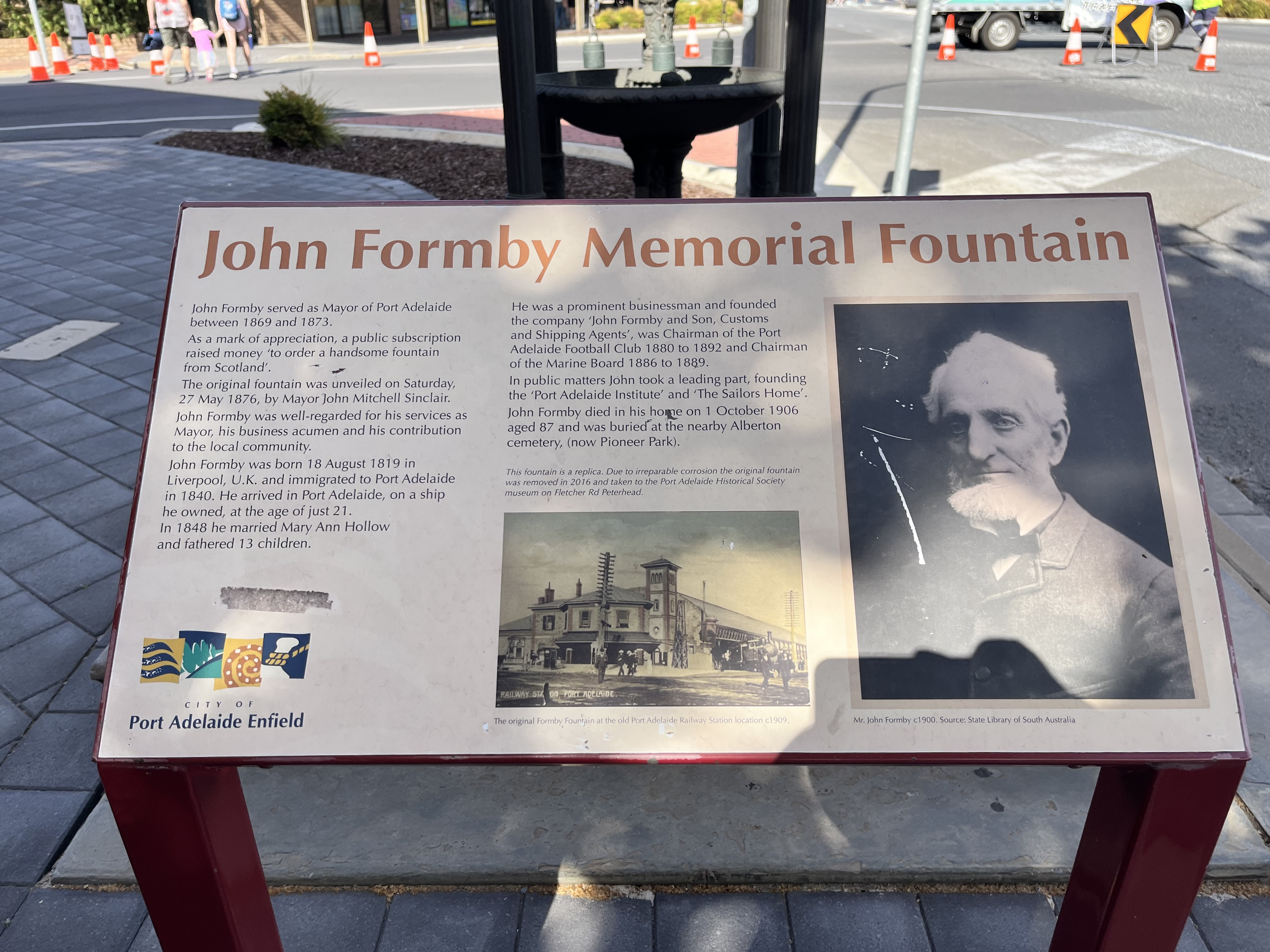
Information board for the John Forby Memorial Fountain.

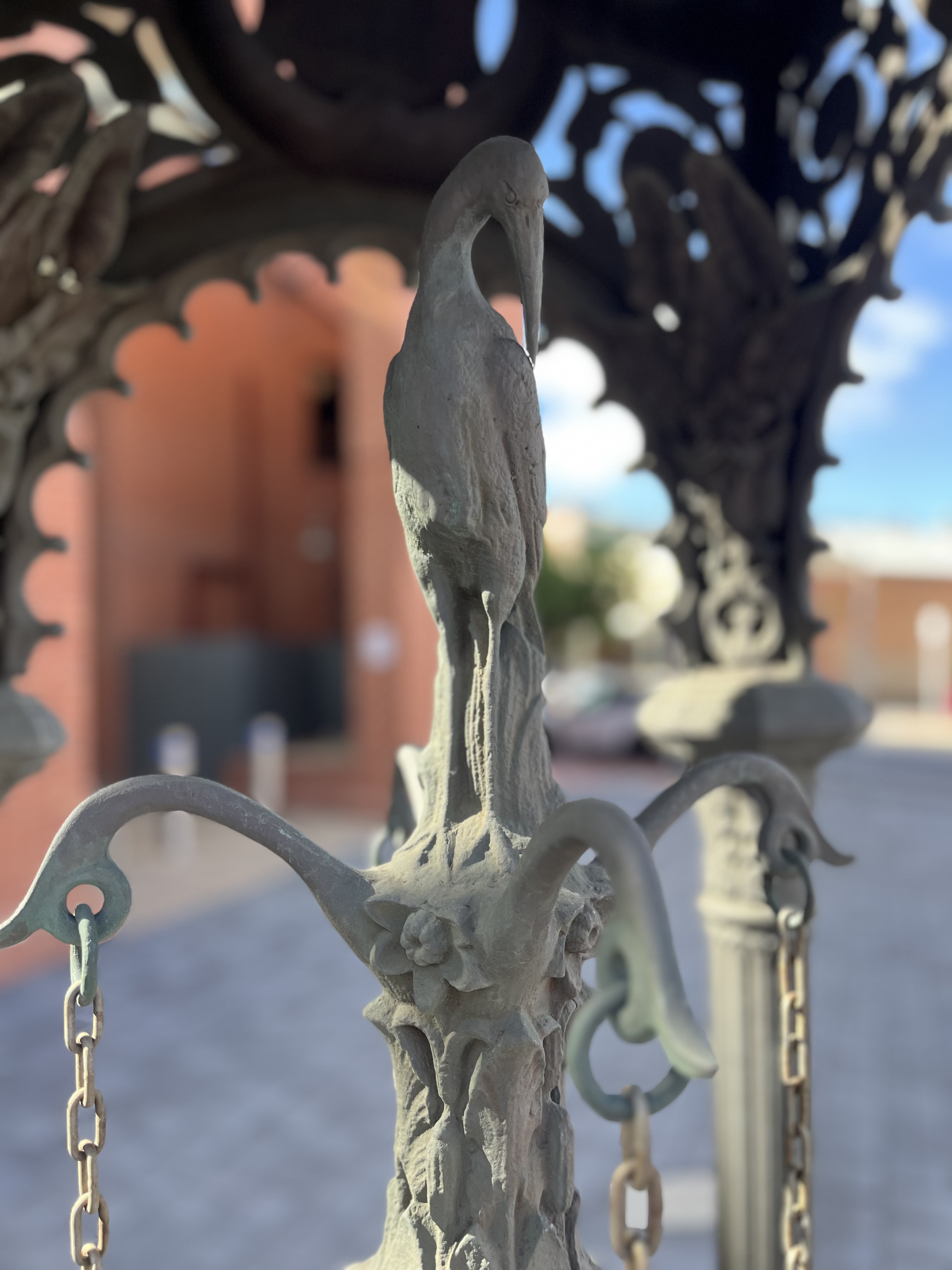
Close up of the bird on the fountain

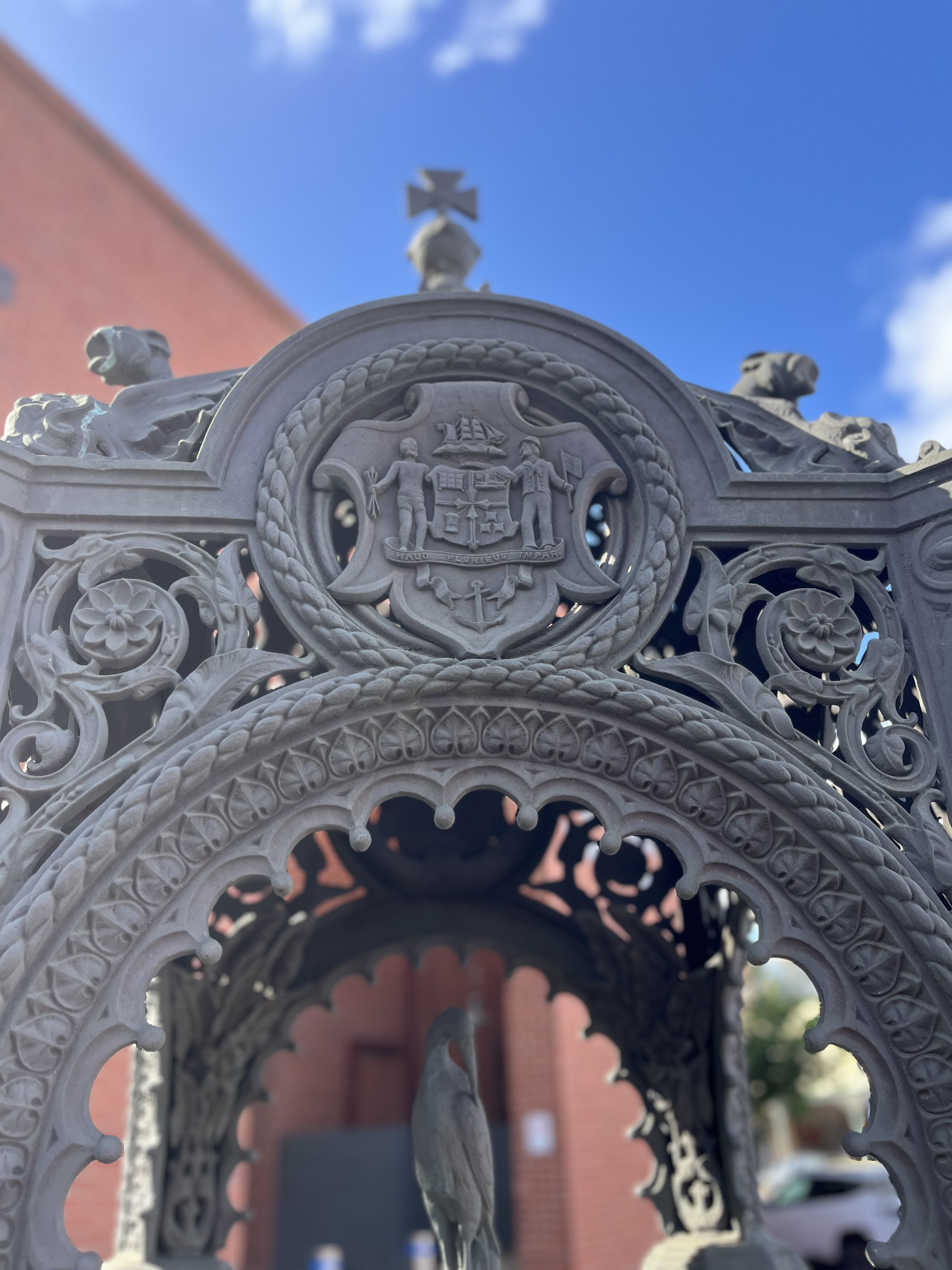
Close of the crest on the fountain. It reads Haud Pluribus Impar.

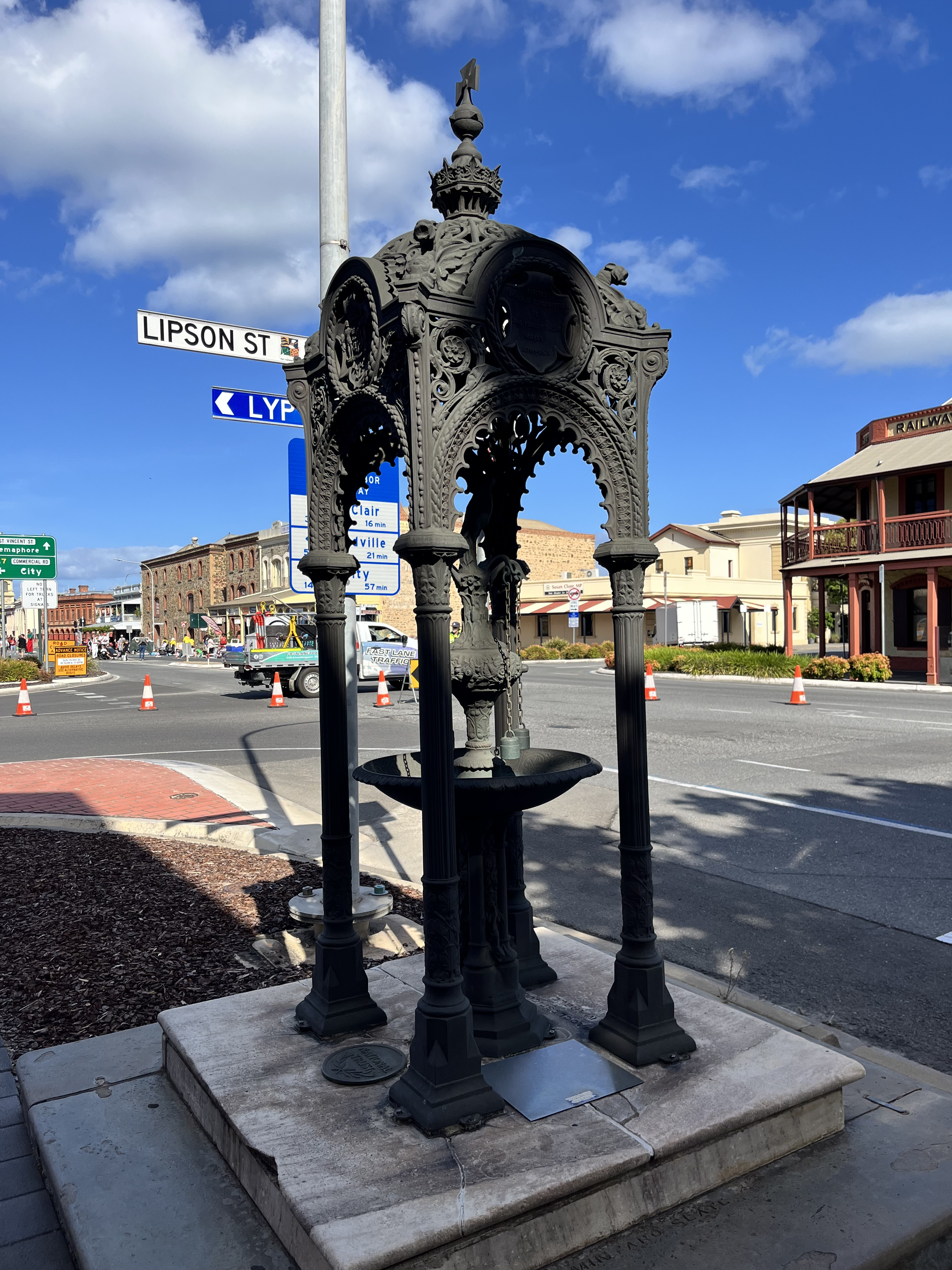
John Formby Memorial Fountain.

Formby was commemorated in Port Adelaide by a memorial fountain, funded by public subscription and cast in Glasgow by W. McFarlane & Co. and erected 27 May 1876 on the corner of North Parade and Nelson Street, later a replica was erected at the corner of St Vincent and Lipson Streets (the original is held by the Port Adelaide Historical Society).

He is also memorialized in the name of Formby Crescent.

== Family ==
Formby married Mary Ann Hollow in 1848. Their children include:

- Edward Formby (1848 – 28 May 1890) married Sarah Solway Hanson in 1872, He was a brewery manager, died in Broken Hill.
- Charles Formby married Emily Liversay, stepdaughter of George Bailey, in 1884
- Alfred Formby (1856–1932) married Julia Davidson in 1880. He married again, to Mary Davidson, in 1884. He was a founder and starter 1892–1897 for the Port Adelaide Racing Club.
- John Formby (1859 – 16 November 1945) married Mary Elizabeth Foote in 1899
- William Formby (1862 – 21 September 1943) married Nellie Rotha Smily (c. 1879 – 13 November 1943) in 1899
