= Thomas Walker Bee =

Public servant in South Australia

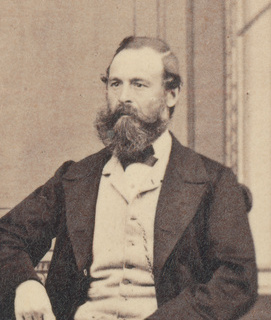

Thomas Walker Bee (c. 1822 – 12 January 1910) was a public servant in the early days of the colony of South Australia.

== History ==
Bee and his wife arrived in Adelaide in 1853. Within a few years Mrs Bee was advertising that she was taking young ladies for classes in French, Italian, music and other subjects at their home in Norwood.

In 1855 Bee joined the South Australian civil service as a clerk with the Emigration department, handling the settlement of large numbers of single female immigrants, mostly from Ireland. It had been anticipated that they would fill the pressing need for domestic servants, but those sent out by the Emigration Commissioners were mostly unskilled and uneducated and more interested in finding husbands than in working for a living. This practice largely ceased in 1856, and Bee was appointed Relieving Officer with the Adelaide Destitute Asylum. The duties of this position included investigation of the applicants for public assistance and prosecution of those supplicants found to have concealed assets or relations who could have provided support.

He resigned in March 1865 for a position with Skelton & Co, elsewhere described as travelling in the South-East for G. & R. Wills, then in 1866 was appointed Inspector of Metropolitan Foot Police following the resignation of the insolvent Peterswald, served to 1873 when he resigned and Peterswald resumed his old post, having in the meantime been gainfully occupied as Warden of the Barossa goldfields. Bee then served as Inspector of Public Houses 1873–1888

Bee and his wife moved to South Perth, Western Australia in 1899, and lived with their son Frank. Bee died at his home, Walcott Street, North Perth.

== Family ==
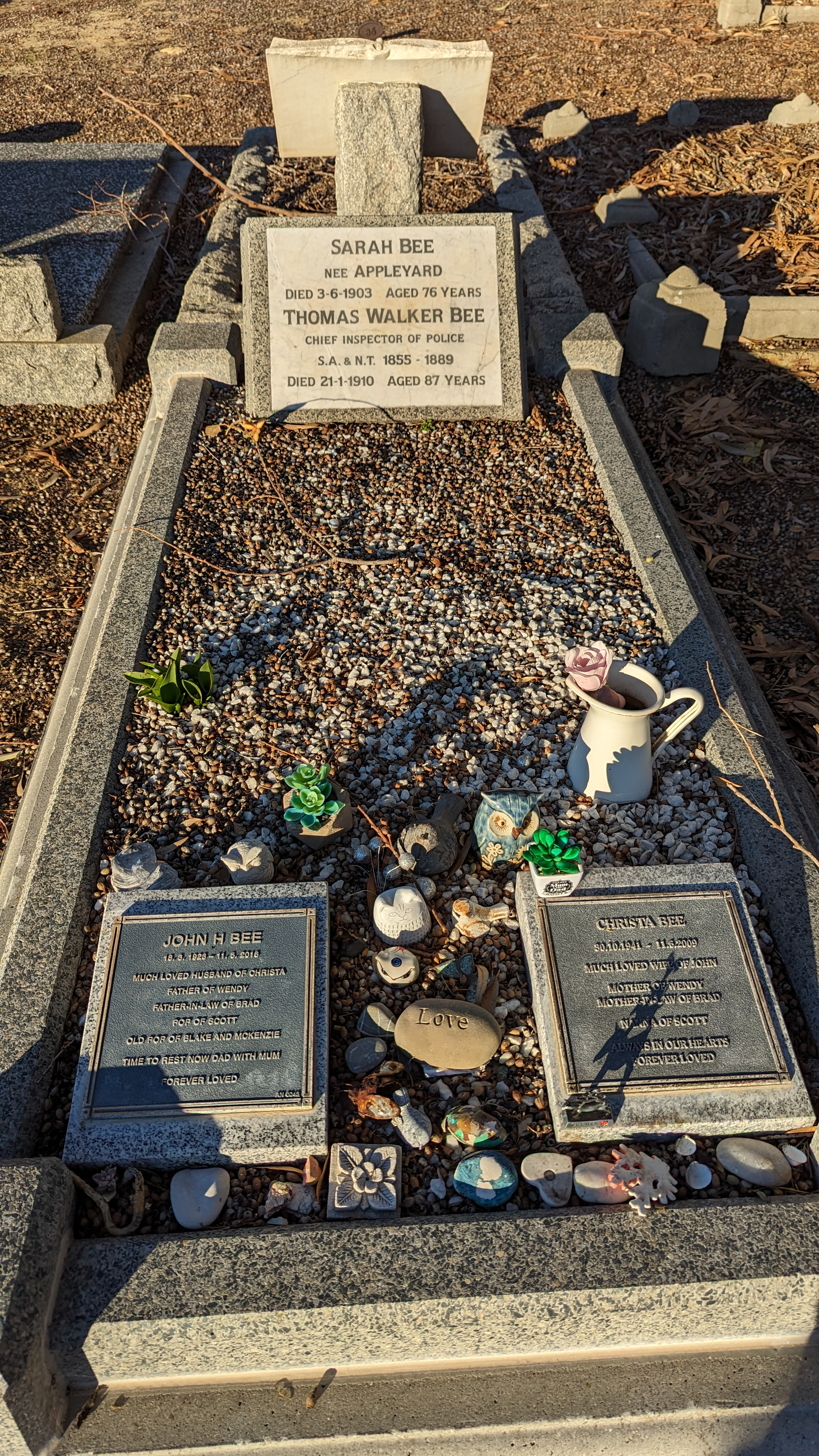
Grave of Thomas Walker Bee and family members

Thomas Walker Bee married Sarah Appleyard ( – 2 June 1903) before emigrating to Australia. Among their children were:

- Tom Bee (4 July 1850 – 21 November 1919), born in Brompton, Middlesex; was educated at Adelaide Educational Institution. He was cadet surveyor to George McLachlan under George Goyder's survey in the Northern Territory, later postmaster in Millicent, South Australia. Bees Creek in the NT was named for him. He married Amy Russell Smith (died 9 October 1936) on 10 June 1886. Their family included:

- Frank Rowland Bee (25 April 1887 – 8 August 1946) "Piccolo Pete", street musician and vagrant in Adelaide.

- Lucy Sarah Bee (1 September 1860 – 1939) married Horace H. Allen on 15 November 1883, lived in Perth. Of at least four sisters, she was the sole survivor to adulthood; photograph with brother Frank in Crompton Collection, SLSA.
- Frank Minchin Bee (31 October 1862 – 5 September 1932) photograph with sister Lucy in Crompton Collection, SLSA.
- Edward George Bee (2 May 1869 – 15 March 1937)
