= William John Peterswald =

Commissioner of Police in South Australia (1829–1896)

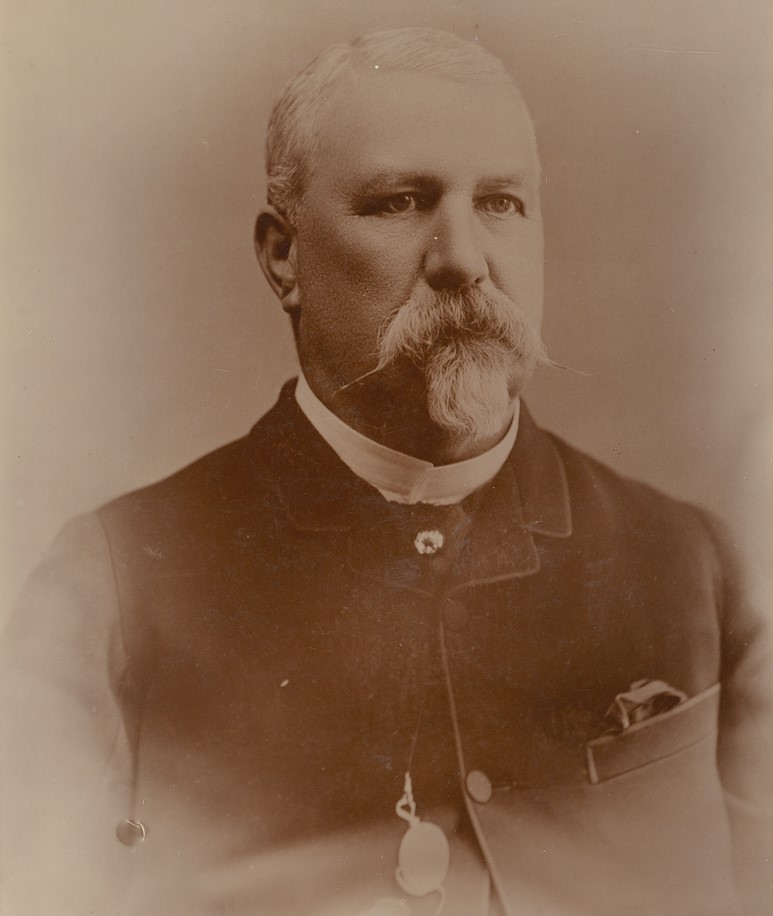
- Born: William John von Peterswald; 28 November 1829; Jamaica, West Indies
- Died: 28 August 1896 (aged 66)
- Resting place: North Road Cemetery
- Education: Edinburgh Academy, Elizabeth College, Guernsey
- Occupation: Chief Commissioner of Police
- Years active: 1882–1896
- Employer: South Australia Police
- Organization: Colony of South Australia
- Title: Commissioner of Police
- Partner: Emily Mary de St Croix

William John Peterswald (1829–1896) was Commissioner of Police of the Colony of South Australia 1882–1896.

== Origins ==
William John von Peterswald was born 28 November 1829 in Jamaica, West Indies, where his father, also named William, managed a large plantation, and received his early education at the Edinburgh Academy. His parents returned to Scotland when slavery was made illegal, and Peterswald's education continued at the Military Academy, Edinburgh, and Elizabeth College at Saint Peter Port, Guernsey, where he commanded the 1st Rifle Company attached to the Channel Islands Militia. The family moved to Liverpool, where his father died, and Peterswald lived for a time on the Continent then went over to Jersey, where some time later he married the Greffier's daughter.

Peterswald and his wife emigrated to South Australia on the Charlotte Jane, arriving in Adelaide in May 1853. He ran a dairy farm at Munno Para for seven years without success, but the voluntary militia company which he raised and commanded was noted for its smartness.

== Police career ==
Having lost his money on the farming venture, he settled in Adelaide, where he gained employment as assistant clerk of the House of Assembly. In 1862, following the murder of Pettinger at Government House, he applied for the now-vacant post of Inspector of Metropolitan Police under Major Warburton, which he won despite his having no experience or knowledge of policing. Four years later he was forced to resign due to insolvency, resulting from his failed dairying venture. Once again the vacancy was filled from outside the police force, this time by T. W. Bee, previously Relieving Officer with the Adelaide Destitute Asylum.

In 1868 he was made Warden of the Barossa goldfields, which had suddenly become active and needed a firm hand to deal with the expected disputes. In August 1873 an exchange of positions saw Bee moving in two steps to Inspector of Licensed Premises and Peterswald returned to Inspector of Metropolitan Police and in 1875 the position was upgraded to Superintendent. He was appointed Acting Commissioner of Police in 1881 and then Commissioner of Police in 1882, succeeding George Hamilton, in which position he served until his death in August 1896.

== Legacy ==
For 15 years Peterswald guided the police through increasing responsibilities despite budget constraints.

As a particular challenge, the police under his leadership established law and order between both European settlers/pastoralists and indigenous communities as the frontier of modernity expanded throughout the vast distances of Central Australia and the Northern Territory. In the latter case, the change was so rapid that in 1884 Peterswald established a branch of native police there.

The difficult conditions necessitated more modern equipment. In the early 1880s Peterswald was responsible for initiating the re-arming of the Police Force. In early 1881 the Police were issued with 200 of the new Martini-Henry rifles in .455/.577 calibre and long-pattern bayonets, as used by the Volunteer Militia Forces. Peterswald also recommended that the Mounted Police be issued with the large New Model No. 3 Smith & Wesson revolver in .44 calibre.

Public economic distress and unemployment during the 1880s and early 1890s presented the police with their first experiences of serious industrial unrest, all of which Peterswald handled with firm impartiality. To improve police esprit de corps he introduced revised uniform patterns and in 1884 encouraged the formation of a police band.

He also introduced uniformity in the colour of police horses, exclusively selecting the impressive greys for metropolitan duty. This strain or breed, despite being somewhat unsuitable for the outback, was later extended to many rural police horses. The "police greys" remain a proud tradition of the South Australian Police Force.

For years Peterswald suffered from diabetes, which was the principal cause of his death. He was accorded with a state funeral, the procession being watched by large crowds of onlookers. His headstone is marked 'This monument was erected by the members of the South Australian Police Force as a mark of esteem and respect for their beloved departed officer' . In later years Peterswald lived at "St. Heliers", on the corner of Ward and Jeffcott streets, North Adelaide. His wife, Emily Mary Peterswald, who was a daughter of Charles de Ste. Croix, Greffier of the Island of Jersey, died 19 April 1916 at her residence on Buxton Street, North Adelaide, also named "St Heliers".
