= Adelaide Destitute Asylum =

Home for people in need in Adelaide, South Australia

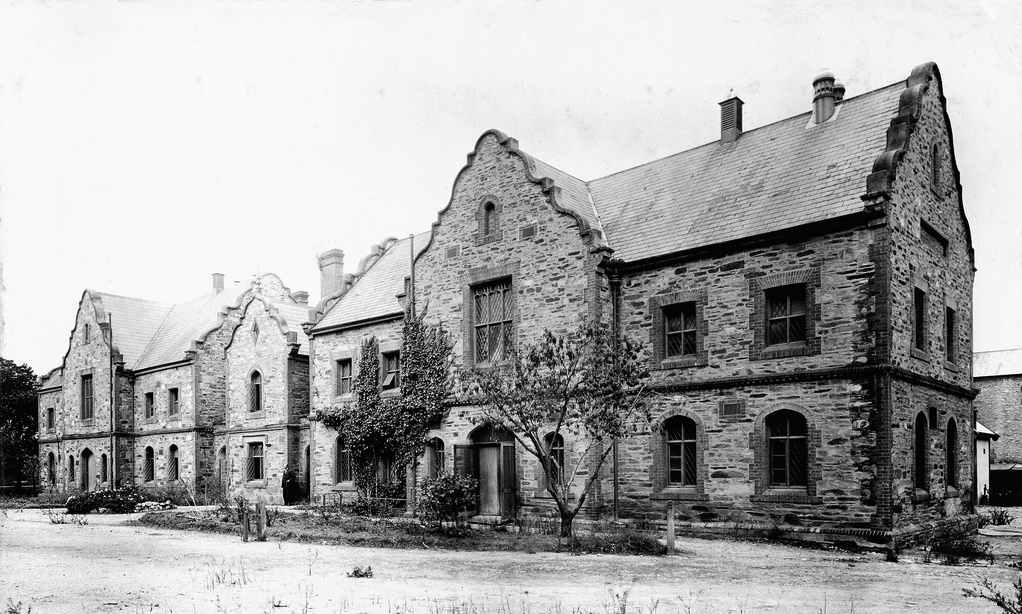
- Male infirmary wards of the Adelaide Destitute Asylum, 7 November 1918

General information
- Type: Poor relief institution
- Location: Kintore Avenue, Adelaide, South Australia, Australia
- Coordinates: 34°55′11.28″S 138°36′07.2″E
- Current tenants: Migration Museum
- Opened: c. 1855
- Closed: 1918
- Governing body: Destitute Board

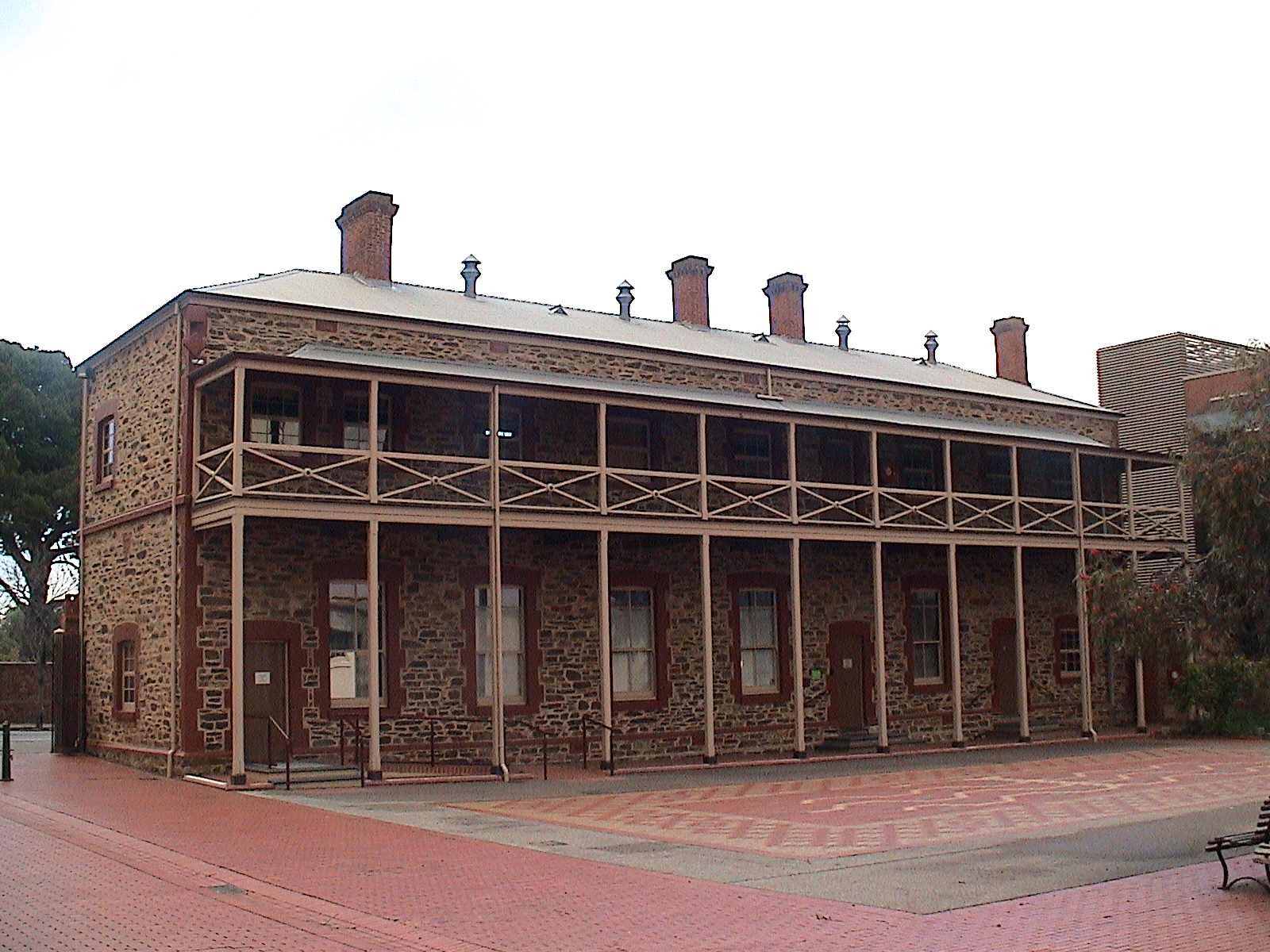
Former Destitute Asylum building, now the Migration Museum

The Destitute Asylum was a government-funded institution in Adelaide in the colony of South Australia, designed to support those of its citizens who had no means of financial support, especially new arrivals and mothers with children. It was first established around 1839 as a Native School (also knowns as the Native School Establishment, and the location as the Native Location), with boarding facilities, for teaching local Aboriginal children, and functioned for some years in this capacity. As the school was not fully supported and therefore under-utilised, it started being used for young women arriving in the colony on their own, sometimes as orphans, and around 1850 became the Destitute Asylum. By 1855 it was holding both males and females, many of whom had been transferred for convalescence from the Adelaide Hospital.

The Destitute Asylum was housed in several buildings, some of which were altered over time. Part of the old asylum now houses the Migration Museum in Kintore Avenue. The asylum was eventually closed in 1912.

== History ==
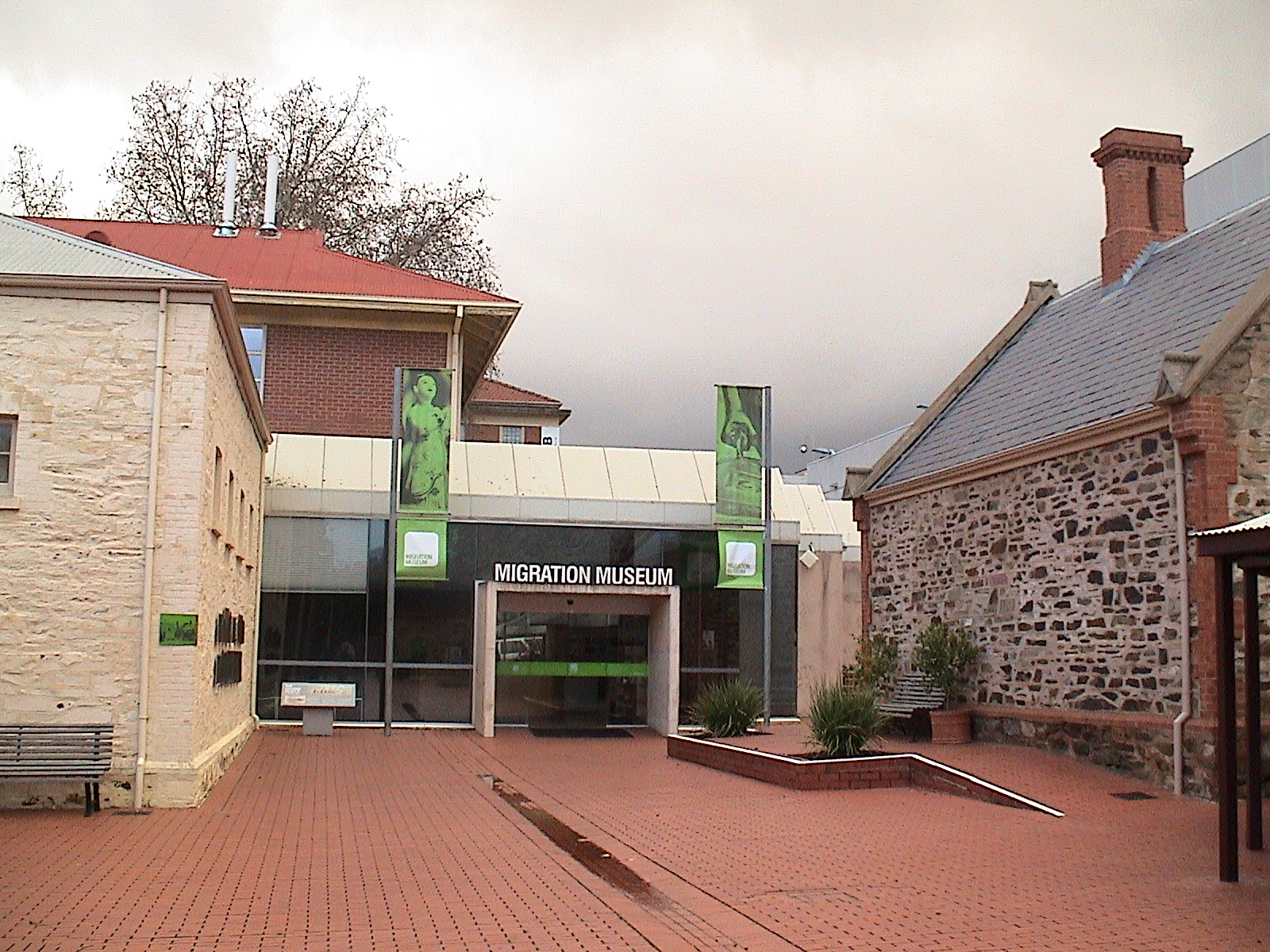
Migration Museum

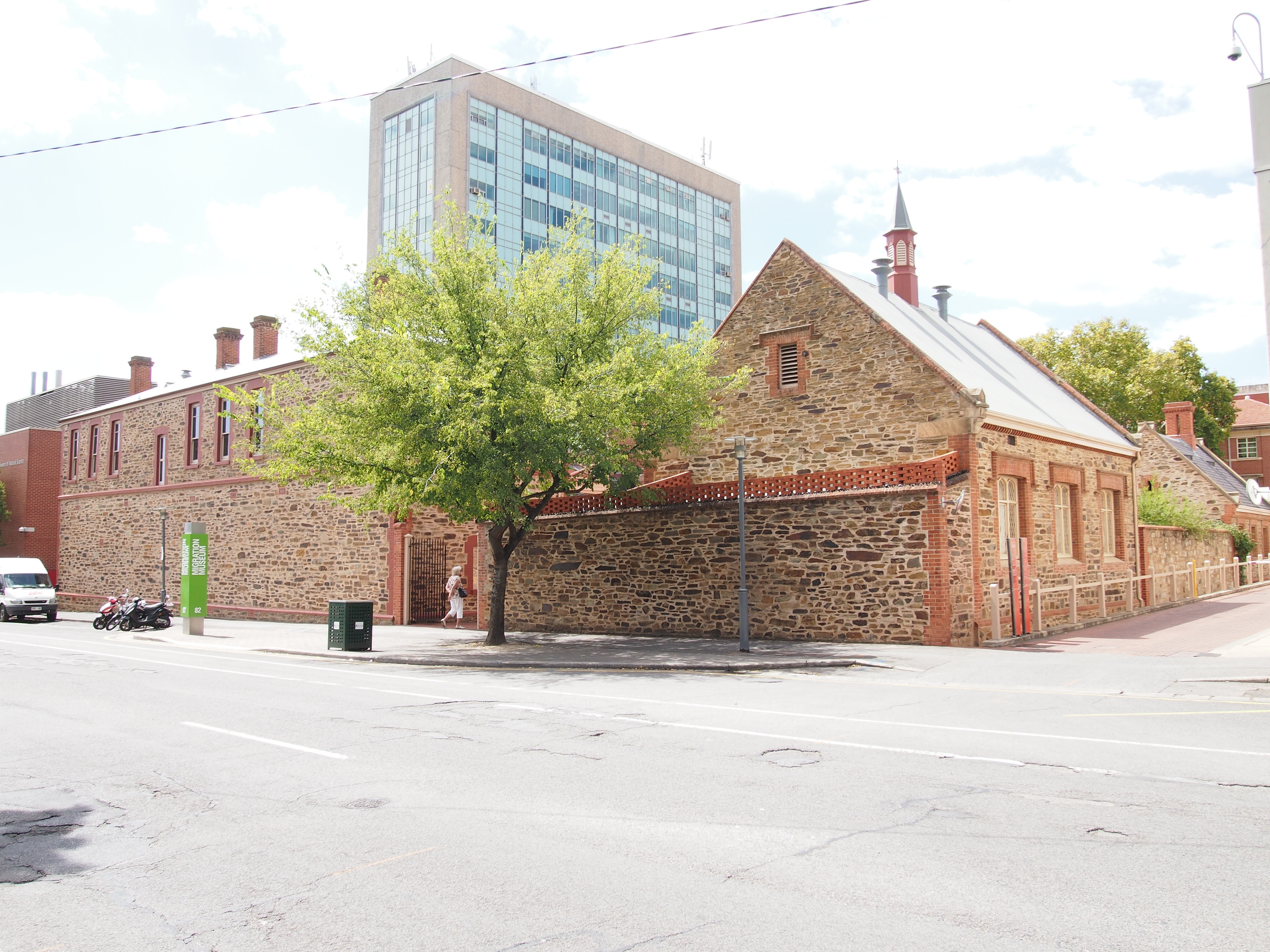

=== Background ===
In 1839 The South Australian Register called for establishment of a benevolent society which would provide the necessities of life for widows and orphans, abandoned children, and industrious workers who by sickness or injury could not provide for themselves and their families; all assuming they had no family to call on. No consideration was given to destitution as the result of general unemployment.

=== Native School ===
Around 1839 a Native School, later designated "Native School Establishment" with boarding facilities was established in the Park Lands near North Terrace in a section designated the Native Location (later the "Old Location"). It was opened in December 1840, supported by Governor George Gawler. By 1841 it had had sufficient success to establish that Aboriginal children were every bit as bright and teachable as white students; however the number attending remained small, largely due to indolence on the part of the colonisers. However this site was dismantled in 1845, on the orders of Governor George Grey, who thought it best to take the children away from their parents, and a new Native School run by the government, which taught only in English, was established near what is now Kintore Avenue. The Native School closed in 1851, with the remaining children were taken to Poonindie Mission at Port Lincoln on the Eyre Peninsula.

=== Emigrants and convalescents ===
In October 1848 a contingent of 219 Irish orphan girls arrived by the Roman Emperor and were given temporary accommodation in the under-utilised schoolhouse by Matthew Moorhouse, who had the dual responsibilities of Protector of Aborigines and Immigration Officer. It had been expected that these girls, aged 9 to 14, would relieve the servant shortage in the colony, but most found husbands instead. Roman Emperor was followed in June 1849 by Posthumous, Florentia, Sir Edward Parry, and Inconstant, all within a few weeks of each other, and additional accommodation for those who did not find a placement immediately was provided at the "Native Location". It was not long before a letter was published in the South Australian Register by one Michael D'Arcy, writing as "Aliquis", alleging that these women were being paid for sex by male colonists.

The South Australian Government instituted the Emigration Board, whose remit was to assist new arrivals who as yet were unable to support themselves. By 1848 it had become the Emigration and Destitute Poor Department, which after dropping the "Emigration" remained the responsible department until around 1910, under the direction of the Destitute Board. They had two programs: "outdoor":distribution of rations to those who would otherwise starve, and "indoor": provision of shelter and medical attention to the homeless.

In 1855 the Asylum had accommodation for 66 inmates, but held 25 males and 46 females, many of whom had been transferred for convalescence from the chronically overcrowded Adelaide Hospital.

In October 1879 ten inmates who were beyond medical help, but whose condition was not contagious and were mentally sound, were transferred to the Home for Incurables in Fullarton, which establishment was later renamed the Julia Farr Centre in honour of its founder.

== Governance ==
=== The Destitute Board ===
The South Australian approach to destitute relief was highly centralised, contrary to that of Britain.

Membership of the first Destitute Board (1850–1859) changed frequently and consisted almost exclusively of ministers of religion, notably Dean James Farrell, the Catholic Fr Michael Ryan (c. 1808 – 24 August 1865) (not to be confused with his nephew, Msgr Michael Joseph Ryan (29 July 1847 – 30 January 1922)), and Rev. Rev. Robert Haining of the Church of Scotland.

Under a new Act — the Destitute Persons Relief Bill, passed on 29 December 1866 — the Board was dissolved and the first meeting of the new Destitute Board, whose responsibilities now also included the Children's Apprenticeship Board, was held at the Destitute Asylum buildings on 15 February 1867.

Edward Holthouse (1813–1890) was Secretary of the Board 1850–1867 and Superintendent of the Asylum, a Civil Service position. On 3 February 1867 T. S. Reed, brother-in-law of Chief Justice Hanson, was appointed Chairman, and senior to Holthouse, whose salary was reduced by £80. When Holthouse protested, he was accused of lack of respect and dismissed.

Emily Clark and Catherine Helen Spence, fearful for the deleterious effect unhealthy and dispirited adults would have on unwanted and orphaned children, sought to remove such children from the Asylum and into respectable homes. Initial trials of their "boarding-out" scheme proved encouraging, and was adopted by Reed, not only as a humanitarian move but for its potential for saving money. By 1873 organisation of the scheme had been put on a firm foundation.

Reed left for England in March 1876 for a year's leave with pay at the end of which time he resigned. Judah Moss Solomon, his replacement, died in August 1880 and Reed, by now back in Adelaide, was reappointed as chairman. In 1886 the State Children's Council was formed to take over that part of the Destitution Board's responsibilities, then in 1888 a Commission charged with streamlining government recommended abolition of Reed's position. The five board members (Adamson, Bower, Dempsey, Smith, Gilbert) resigned in protest at not being consulted.

In the meantime their work was done by Superintendent Arthur Lindsay (1828–1909) and members of the Destitute Department under control of the Chief Secretary. In January 1889 the post of Chairman was added to his responsibilities and £15 p.a. to his salary. G. W. Hawkes, Henry Kelly, J.P., Joshua Gurr, Charles Clark, J.P., and A. A. Fox, J.P. were appointed to the new Board. Lindsay retired in 1905 and was succeeded by T. H. Atkinson (1859–1933), his longtime deputy.

=== Destitute Commission ===
In 1883 parliament appointed a commission to enquire into the operation of the Destitute Act. Chairman was the Chief Justice, (Samuel Way), and members included C. H. Goode; Maurice Salom; W. Haines, W. Bundey (mayor); Henry W. Thompson; C. Proud acted as secretary. Chief subjects examined were the boys' reformatories at Magill and the hulk Fitzjames at Largs Bay; the girls' reformatory and the evils of the barrack system compared with the boarding-out plan. Goode and Thompson subsequently became members of the State Children's Council.

== Staff ==
Day-to-day running of the Asylum was in the hands of several appointed officers:

=== Superintendent ===
Initially, the Destitute Asylum had no-one responsible for day-to-day operations. In 1855 Matthew Moorhouse, Protector of Aborigines, had the position of Comptroller of the Destitute Poor Establishment, and also that of Superintendent of the Female Immigrant Depot added to his responsibilities, but had no direct involvement. He retired 15 months later. Any problems the staff had were to be resolved by the Secretary of the Destitute Board. The position of Superintendent of the Destitute Asylum was created in 1863, initially as a non-Board position, and was held by:

- 1863–1867 Edward Holthouse (1813–1890) — when the Board was dissolved; the new Board considered he was uncooperative, and sacked him.
- 1869–1897 Arthur Lindsay (1828–1909), not to be confused with Arthur Fydell Lindsay. His appointment made him also secretary to the Board, later chairman, a conjugation deplored by Rev. Stephenson, though he considered Lindsay an admirable appointment, sentiments echoed by a Register commentator. After his retirement as superintendent he continued as chairman of the Board until 1904. His daughter Theresa married the (unrelated) explorer David Lindsay.
- 1897–1904 Thomas Henry Atkinson (1859–1933) acted in the position 1890, and again in 1894, then was appointed superintendent and secretary of the board 1897. He was appointed chairman in 1904.
- 1904–1916 Edward James Tregenza (1860–1935) was superintendent and accountant. When the Asylum was transferred to Magill in 1916, Tregenza stayed on at the old site, which became a maternity home and depot for distribution of rations.

=== Matron ===
- c. 1863 Sarah Bee (c. 1827–1903), wife of T. W. Bee, for a time Relieving Officer (see below)
- 1865–1866 or later Mrs Eliza Olifent (c. 1821–1881) (James Smith Olifent was appointed Relieving Officer at the same time)
- 1871–1877 Sarah Maria Hunt, née Calton (–1904); part of lying-in hospital used as girls' reformatory; a most unsatisfactory arrangement; transferred to Magill in 1881.
- 1879 Mary Hodgkins (1822–1908)
- 1879–1880 Mrs Eliza Dillon (c. 1836–1890) midwife, married to John Francis Dillon (c. 1840–1890)
- 1881 Emma Amelia Benneyworth acting matron
- ??–1885 Mrs. A(lice) Gertrude Kenny (c. 1842 – 18 April 1885), a widow
- 1893, 1895 Ellen Thompson (earlier marriage Ellen McDonald) (c. 1834 – 13 December 1901)
- 1900–1905 Florence Elizabeth "Flo" Pearce (–1948) matron of lying-in branch are there two matrons?
- 1900–1911 Bessie Uppington (previously with the State Children's Department) married Theo Boothby 1911 and left for England.
- 1912–1913 Mrs Adams in position for seven years; resigned over Nurse Dunstan affair. (Note: In February 1913 Matron Emily Adams and three nurses L. E. Dryden, R. Boord and O'Brien handed in their resignations rather than work with Nurse J. Dunstan. There was no question of her relationship with patients, her knowledge, ability or work ethic, quite the reverse; it was her abrasive personality. A year earlier, she had been at the centre of a similar dispute at the Adelaide Hospital which nearly ruined the career of Nurse Graham. A board of enquiry (G. F. Claridge, James Evans, Thomas Leahy, F. J. T. Pflaum, and Mrs S. H. Vennell) exonerated Nurse Dunstan and Chief Secretary Bice accepted the resignations of Adams and the three nurses. The Attorney-General Homburg refused to table Dunstan's list of grievances.)
- 1913–1918 Gertrude Peggram, promoted from head nurse of lying-in ward, and transferred to a similar position at the new Magill Home. Her husband worked as porter at the Mental Hospital, a job that arguably could have gone to a returned soldier.

=== Relieving Officer ===
This was a board position, whose duty it was to assess prospective recipients, to check their bona fides and living arrangements, and what resources, including family, they could call on and what assets they could liquidate, then to determine what rations they should be allocated, to pay for essential services, burial of a child for instance, or to be admitted to the Asylum.

- Richard Edward Tapley (died 1891) 1849– Mrs Arabella Tapley somehow associated with the position.

Tapley was Secretary to the (Board for the Relief of the Destitute Poor) Destitute Board in 1850–1855; in 1855 described as Keeper of the Destitute Asylum'

- Thomas Walter Bee (c. 1822–1910) was Relieving Officer 1856–1865.
- James Smith Olifent snr (c. 1818 – 21 January 1890) April 1865 – 1880. Mrs Olifent served as Matron.

=== Visiting Officer ===
Duties included visiting past inmates to check on their living arrangements. Those who had clearly been dissembling or whose circumstances had improved (through inheritance or marriage etc.) were invoiced for the cost of their accommodation.

=== Teacher ===
By 1865 a schoolhouse had been built on the grounds, and one John Young (not John L. Young) and his wife were appointed teachers. The school closed with the opening of the Industrial School at Magill and the increase in boarding-out and adoption of orphans.

=== Head Wardsman ===
Another key position was that of head wardsman, held by Ernest Charles Gunther (died 1929) from at least 1901–1911. Gunther and matron Uppington represented the Asylum when the Duke and Duchess toured North Terrace in 1901.

== Inmates by gender ==
Most of the occupants of the laying-in department were unmarried girls. Their best hopes of subsequent solvency, if they had no family to return to, lay in marriage or domestic service, otherwise they were destined for prostitution or the Asylum. It was notorious that many women and children became destitute when their husbands and fathers left without trace, into the country or interstate, out of reach of the authorities and any but the most determined and resourceful of wives. Catherine Helen Spence observed in 1906 that the Destitute Board was so fearful of supporting healthy men who could not find work that it refused sustenance to his wife and children, compelling the man to desert them, a major cause of broken families.

Given these facts, it would be expected that most of the Asylum's inmates would be female but that was far from the case. Males outnumbered females two to one.

"The Commonwéalth old age pension system came into operation in 1909, and there was a drop in the ratio per thousand of population of persons assisted by the State Government from 9.43 in 1908–09 to 9.31 in 1909–10."

== The buildings ==
The Asylum was first accommodated in the old Police Court, a collection of single-storey buildings around a quadrangle near the Barracks. In the early 1860s, in response to overcrowding, those buildings to the east and south of the quadrangle were given an upper storey, and a schoolroom was added. The courtroom became the children's ward; a living room with sleeping quarters at each end, and a bathroom (hot and cold water) attached. Clothing for inmates was made at the women's work room, and washed by the stronger women in the laundry.

The Destitute Asylum was a hodge-podge of individual buildings erected as the need arose and where space was available. As a consequence for example, there were two men's dormitories, situated at either side of the complex, the centre being occupied by the females. Male inmates were exclusively aged, invalid or diseased; no able-bodied man would be admitted. However many people were admitted who were not paupers but admitted through lack of space at the hospital for convalescent patients, or those suffering incurable or chronic conditions. Traditional inmate employment, breaking rocks and oakum-picking, was limited by available space. Existence of relatives capable of maintaining them was often discovered by opening their mail.

Residents of the Female section (established 1851) were mostly single mothers or wives whose husbands had left for the gold diggings in (especially) Victoria. In 1855 there were eight beds in this ward.

=== Lying-in ward ===
"Lying-in" is the traditional rest period accorded a woman after she has given birth, when her sole responsibility is to her baby, and has little or no contact with men.

The Asylum had a lying-in ward on the upper floor of the women's ward east of the quadrangle in 1865, but it was not of a high standard, and newspapers report Adelaide's first lying-in ward as founded in October 1867 in Flinders Street, and had been set up to service recent immigrants and poor but respectable wives and widows, but also young single mothers. Mrs Hunt was the matron in 1879 when the facility moved to the Destitute asylum, and she became matron to both institutions. The upper storey housed the most tractable and responsible women, chiefly married women and girls pregnant for the first time; those needing closer oversight (chiefly unmarried girls pregnant for the second or third time) on the ground floor, and a separate ward was dedicated to infected prostitutes; there being at that time no cure or useful treatment for the principal venereal diseases. The lying-in home was governed by the Destitute Board but registered separately from the Asylum, and there was to be no fraternisation between inmates of the two institutions.

The matron served as midwife, and officiated at all births that did not require use of obstetric instruments, in which case a surgeon would be called from the Adelaide Hospital. The matron was expected to notify the hospital when a birth was imminent so trainee doctors could observe, however the exchange of knowledge which could have benefited both parties was limited due to professional jealousy. An abuse of the system, whereby a woman who after giving birth would dispose of the child then hire herself out to a well-to-do family as a wetnurse, was mitigated by requiring her to remain at the home for six months. By which time a strong bond with the baby would usually have developed, and the mother would presumably have benefited from the matron's knowledge and experience.

In 1869 a section adjacent the ground floor section was set apart as a Girls' Reformatory. This proved a poor decision, as the introduction of the irresponsible element led to a breakdown of morale and self-discipline among the young mothers, and in 1881 the Reformatory girls were moved to what had been the Boys' Reformatory at Magill.

=== Morgue ===
Adelaide city morgue was established in an open field behind the State Library well away from any other building, however in the ensuing thirty years the Destitute Asylum had expanded to such an extent that parts of the Asylum, notably the Lying-in wards, were uncomfortably close, calls were made for it to be replaced.

In 1886 a new morgue was built at the West Terrace Cemetery and went into service that June. The old one was not demolished however, as witnessed by the SA Museum photographer in 1918.

=== Chapel ===
Three services were held each Sunday: Baptist, Wesleyan (Methodist), and Episcopalian (Anglican). Catholic Mass was conducted here fortnightly.

=== Store ===
"Outdoor relief" was an office established to supply basic food to indigent citizens who would otherwise starve. Approved recipients would queue up outside at the northernmost entrance, where they would be issued with flour, salt, tea and sugar. Chits for meat and (as an alternative to the flour ration) bread were issued, redeemable at the contract butcher and the Aerated Bread Company. It was the duty of the Relieving Officer to visit the homes of those seeking or receiving rations, to check the bona fides of recipients.

=== Library ===
A stock of well-thumbed books, whose original covers had been replaced with sturdy buckram boards, was opened every Thursday by Rev. Dendy, who acted as librarian. Most inmates were literate, and fresh donations were welcomed.

== General conditions ==
Of course conditions for the inmates changed over time, but in the 1890s there was one nurse to attend the male inmates during the day and a (male) night attendant, also a wardsman selected from within their ranks to assist and keep order. The inmates included blind men; there was as yet no separate institution for the blind. There was a separate section for consumptives, but their building had no indoor lavatory, so commodes were used. Dr. Clindening, who found the inmates obnoxious, visited each of the tubercular patients once a week. There were three nurses for the female section: two during the day and one at night, all supervised by the matron. The men were allowed out of the compound for an hour once a week, but were obliged to wear an institution jumper (which Rev. Bryant C. Stephenson, visiting chaplain for much of that decade, deplored) rather than their own clothes. Meals were mostly meat (boiled or roast mutton principally) and potatoes, with bread and lard or butter. A "sick diet" consisted largely of oatmeal, soup and gruel and wine.

" It ceased to be an asylum in 1931, The Adelaide Destitute Asylum housed women and children in dire poverty. The number of inmates increased significantly when husbands deserted their families during the Victorian gold rush. Destitute Asylum which was erected in 1854."

"By 1856 a quadrangle of buildings in Kintore Avenue off North Terrace known as the Destitute Asylum was providing indoor relief to many women, men and children in the new colony. Welfare provisions introduced at the turn of the century reduced the demand for the home and it was finally closed in 1918."

"The Old Destitute Asylum was founded in 1856. It housed 65 women, 30 men and 43 children. It provided government assistance to vulnerable immigrants who had no relatives in the colony."

"Buildings were added over the years to accommodate the poor, infirm and orphans. Some of these buildings included a nursery, wash-house, stables and a morgue. The Destitute Asylum operated until 1926 providing financial assistance and temporary accommodation to the needy."

"This stone building, with its Dutch gables and slate roof, was originally part of the Police Barracks and was granted to the Destitute Board in April 1851."

"Destitute Asylum situated in Kintore Avenue was built of bluestone in 1877-78. Buildings were added over the years to accommodate the poor, infirm and orphans. Some of these buildings included a nursery, wash-house, stables and a morgue. The Destitute Asylum operated until 1926 providing financial assistance and temporary accommodation to the needy."

"The Mounted Police barracks, with a brick archway leading to a quadrangle, was built between 1851 and 1855, and served until 1917, when a new facility was built on the Port Road near the Adelaide Gaol. One of the buildings was used by Adelaide Teachers College from 1921, after they had been evicted by the University, pending erection of a new building on Kintore Avenue.

"Destitute Asylum situated in Kintore Avenue was built of bluestone in 1877-78. The two storey building depicted is part of the women's general quarters and not on Kintore Avenue. It is part of quadrangle C, buildings 26 and 20. Arches feature along the walls of both storeys providing shelter from the elements."

== Historic photographs ==
Around 1900, an unnamed government department prepared a plan of the establishment designated GRG 27/32. A copy now held by SA Archives, on which some person has pencilled a key to Areas and Building/Room numbers, is reproduced here. Note that, contrary to usual practice, west is at the top. The (colored) location map alongside has been rotated to correspond.

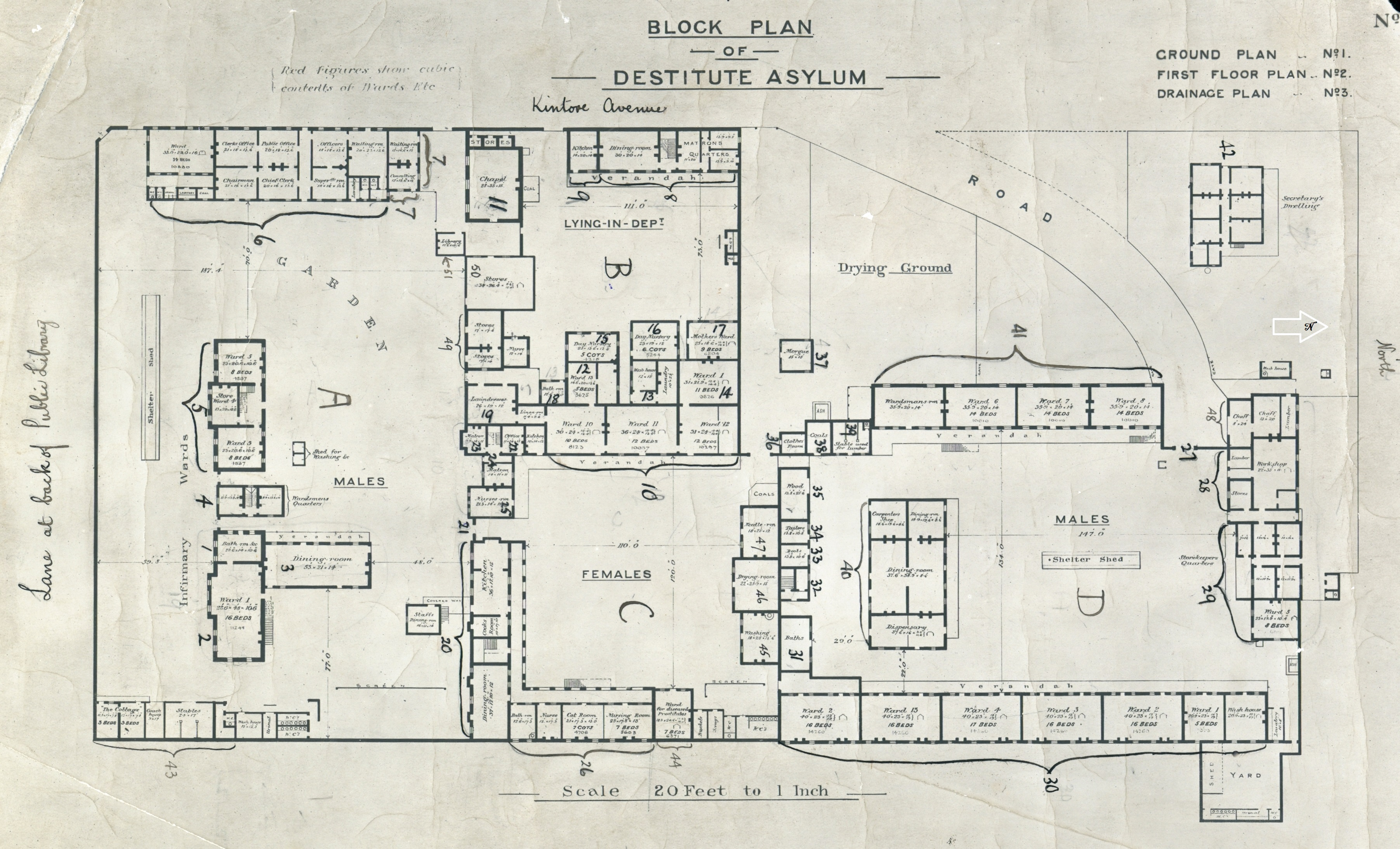
Destitute Asylum block plan GRG 27/32 c. 1900

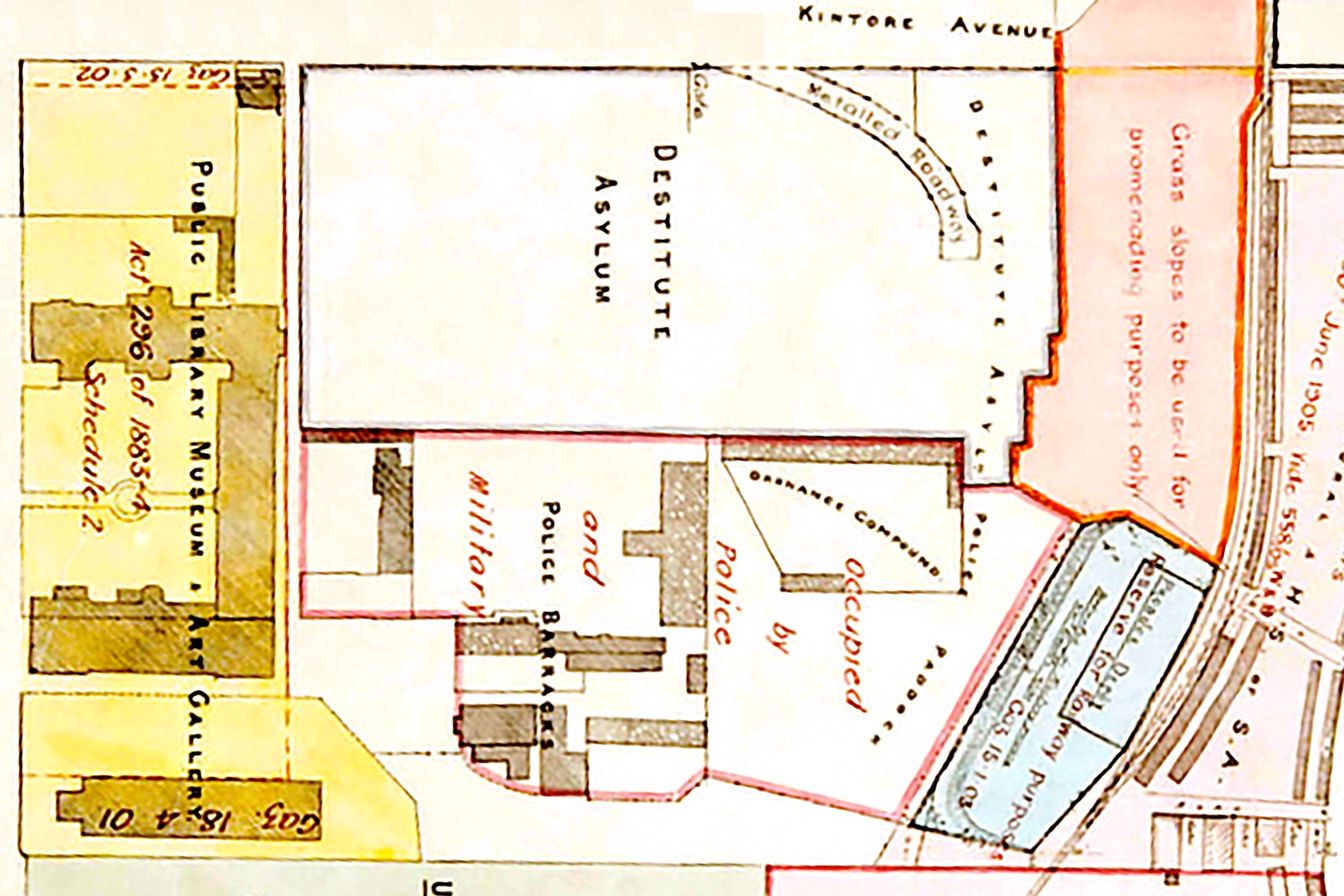
Location on North Terrace

Area A Male infirmary and Admin block
Area B Lying-in Dept
Area C Female destitute
Area D Male destitute
Area E External to walled area, notably the superintendent's house (1877)

In November 1917, with demolition of many of the Asylum's buildings imminent, the South Australian Museum took a series of photographs, which the State Library now hold, and have made digital copies freely available. A number of these have been adapted and listed below, sequenced by Area, roughly clockwise, and the Room/Building numbers are listed Left to Right (S→N), Top to Bottom (W→E) of the plan.

Pic	Area	Looking	Building / room nos. & function	SLSA Link	Notes
	A	W	6 Ward, Offices, Waiting rm, Lavatory, W.C.s; 7 Consulting rm, Waiting rm	B-188	
	A	N	11 Chapel; 51 Library; 50 Stores; 49 Stores	B-2351	Two-storey buildings 8, 9 behind and to right
	A	N	49 Stores; 19 Laundresses; 23 Matron	B-7935	
	A	NW	23 Matron; 24 Matron; 25 Nurses' rm	B-183	
	A	N	24 Matron; 25 Nurses' rm 21 Archway; 20 Kitchen, Cook's rm, Dining rm	B-7473 see also B-194	Artwork by Leslie Wilkie. Low verandah (also serves as covered walkway to matron's office) obscures matron's room (with open spire), adjoins nurses' quarters with triple leadlights (previously a chapel ?)
	A	N	25 Nurses' rm 21 Archway	B-198	
	A	N	25 Nurses' rm 21 Archway; 20 Kitchen etc.	B-2375	1924 photo. Archway bricked-in, chimney added since 1867 photo. Staff dining room, covered way and doorway shown on plan GRG 27/32 no longer evident
	A	SW	2 Ward 1; 3 Dining rm	B-2352	1924 photo
	A	NW	5 Wards 3/4/5; 4 Wardsmen's qtrs 1 Bath rm 2 Ward 1	B-796	One of the three infirmary wards was set apart for Roman Catholics.
	A	N	4 Wardsmen's qtrs 1 Bath rm	B-10206	1927 Christmas card by Leslie Wilkie
	A	N	1 Bath rm 2 Ward 1	B-1024	Photo c. 1868. 1, 2 in "Old Armory" at far left. Also visible are buildings 3, 43, 20 (no chimney on east wall yet). Mounted Police barracks (built 1855) on right are outside Plan GRG 27/32.
	A	N	2 Ward 1; 20 Kitchen etc.	B-211	Building to right is outside plan GRG 27/32
	A	SW	2 Ward 1; 3 Dining rm	B-205	Rear of Bdg 2
	B	E	11 Chapel	B-2354	
	B	W	11 Chapel; 9 Kitchen; 8 Dining rm	B-206	Kintore avenue is behind these buildings.
	B	E	17 Mothers ward 16 Day Nursery; 15 Day Nursery	B-2349	
	B	E	15 Day Nursery	B-201	
	C	N	47 Needle rm 46 Drying rm 45 Washing	B-191	Furthest right is support for external staircase, Bdg 26.
	C	NE	45 Washing; 30 Wards (six); 44 Ward for Diseased Prostitutes	B-182	
	C	SE	44 Ward for Diseased Prostitutes; 26 Nursing rm, Cot rm, Nurse, Bath rm 20 Kitchen etc.	B-192	
	C	SE	26 Nursing rm etc. 20 Kitchen etc.	B-7936	
	C	E	20 Kitchen etc.	B-195	cloister details
	C	SE	30 Wards (six); 31 Baths	B-196	Upper storey of Bdg 26 at end. Museum tower in distance.
	C	S	40 Carpenter shop, Dining rm, Dispensary; 31 Baths	B-203	Bdg 31 is behind, far left; State Library tower in distance
	C	W	10 Wards 10/11/12 (female)	B-197	Chapel tower (Bdg 11) just visible
	C	S	21 Archway; 25 Nurses' rm 24 Matron; 22 Office	B-204	
	D	W	41 Wards 8/7/6; Wardsman's rm 40 Dining rm etc.	B-208	
	D	SE	40 Carpenters shop, Dining rm, Dispensary; 34 Tailors; 33 Boots; 32 No desc.	B-212	Bdg 30 behind Bdg 40
	D	SE	33 Boots; 32 Tailors; 31 Wood	B-2350	
	D	E	48 Chaff rm 28 Workshop; 30 Wards (six)	B-2348	Corner of Bdg 41 on right
	E	E	41 Wards 8/7/6; Wardsman's rm 39 Stable used for lumber 37 Morgue	B-210	Southern part of Bdg 41; horse is in front of Bdg 36 (Clothes rm); Photo taken from Kintore Ave
	E	E	42 Secretary's dwelling	B-2356	

== Relocation ==
It was decided to remove the institution from the city, and in 1912 a site was settled on at Magill, west of the Reformatory. Having such a prime location on North Terrace, various Government departments found uses for parts of the old Destitute Asylum and the adjacent Police barracks (which had been relocated to the Thebarton Police Barracks on Port Road, on a section of the Park Lands):

- State government garage and service station, a long lean-to in front of buildings 1,2,4,5, parallel to North Terrace, behind the Art Gallery and building 3 around the corner was still in use in 1935.
- Returned soldiers were taught trade skills. This photograph, was taken in 1920 in front of building 20.
- Young men, brought out from Britain in the 1920s as apprentice farm workers under the South Australian Farm Apprenticeship Scheme ("Barwell Boys"), were trained here, as in this photograph and this taken around 1923 in front of building 20. It is likely they were accommodated here while undergoing training.
- The Education Department had part of its teacher training school here as early as 1920. this group of women teachers and trainees are in front of the gateway between buildings 49 and 19.
- The lying-in home on Kintore Avenue was converted to offices and laboratories for the Government Analyst and Director of Chemistry (Dr. W. A. Hargreaves).
- The Museum took over a section as a storehouse for natural history specimens, which may have included their well-known sperm whale skeleton.
- The Public Stores Department took over a number of large rooms for supplies from which any Government department can requisition, and a similar store for the Magill Home supplies and those for "outdoor relief".
- The Electoral Office used a section for storage of voting paraphernalia.
- The Arts and Crafts School which used to be conducted on the first floor of the Jubilee Exhibition Building, used two or three rooms after they were evicted to make way for its use as a hospital in the 1919 Spanish flu epidemic.
- The Destitute Board continued to occupy the administrative section, and Dr. Morris retained his consulting rooms there.
- The Public Library used a section for the storing of old volumes and documents.

Did this collection become the State Archives in the old chapel? (Building 11)

- In 1927 the Adelaide Teachers' College had a new building on Kintore Avenue, architect Alfred Edward Simpson.
- The ground floor of the Police barracks became the Adelaide Children's Library.
- In 1937 an extension of the Adelaide Technical College was built on the "Lying-in" site marked B on the Plan.
- Today several of the Adelaide Destitute Asylum buildings are home to the Migration Museum, which opened on 26 August 2003, and is operated by the History Trust of South Australia. An exhibition entitled "Behind the Wall", detailing the lives of several of its inmates, was held there in 2010. An event commemorating the 1678 babies born at the Asylum was held in 2018.

== Legislation ==
The Asylum was subject to the following Acts of the South Australian Parliament

- "An Act to provide for the maintenance and relief of deserted wives and children and other destitute persons, and to make the property of husbands and near relatives to whom assistance they have a natural claim in certain circumstances available for their support" 1842
- "An Act for the regulation of the asylum for the destitute poor and other purposes" No. 2 of 1863
- "The Destitute Persons Relief Act" 1866
- "The Destitute Persons Relief and Industrial and Reformatory Schools Act" 1872
- "The Destitute Persons Act" 1881
- "The Destitute Persons Act Amendment Act" 1886

== Bibliography ==
- Mary-Louise Geyer (1994). Behind The Wall. Axiom / Migration Museum. ISBN 9780947338565. 2nd ed. Wakefield Press, 2008 ISBN 9781743055779 The story of the many women who gave birth in the Destitute Asylum.
- Susan Piddock (1996). Accommodating the destitute : an historical and archaeological consideration of the Destitute Asylum of Adelaide (thesis; ms.).
- Donovan and Associates & Danvers Architects (1983). SA Museum redevelopment : conservation analysis, Destitute Asylum, Kintore Avenue. Public Buildings Department, South Australia.
- David Parham (1983). Architecture of the Destitute Asylum, Adelaide : an exhibition held at the Flinders University Art Museum. Flinders University Art Museum.
- Bronte Ann Gould (2012). Midwife to the Destitute : Adelaide, South Australia, 1880–1905 (thesis, ms.).
- Brian Dickey (1986). Dependence in South Australia 1888 : the Destitute Board and its clients.
- Corporation of the City of Adelaide : former chapel, Kintore Avenue, Adelaide. Public Buildings Department, South Australia. 1981.
- Corporation of the City of Adelaide : former schoolroom, Kintore Avenue, Adelaide. Public Buildings Department, Adelaide. 1981.

== See also ==
- Magill Youth Training Centre
