= Migration Museum, Adelaide =

Culture museum in Adelaide, South Australia

Migration Museum
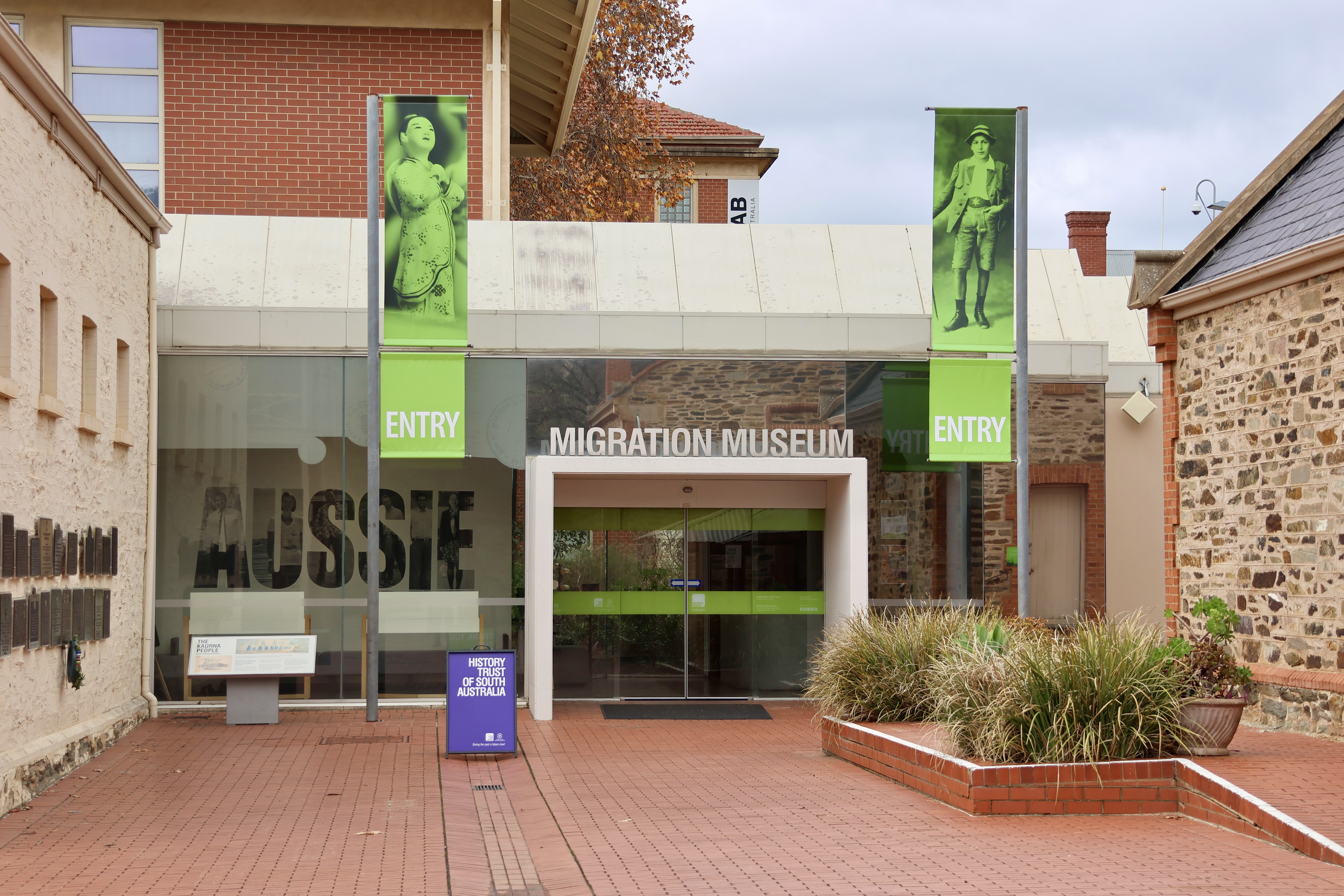
- The museum in 2025
- Established: 23 November 1986; 39 years ago
- Location: 82 Kintore Avenue, Adelaide SA 5000, Australia
- Coordinates: 34.9198°S 138.6020°E
- Type: Culture museum
- Visitors: 183,936 (2015–16)
- Website: migration.history.sa.gov.au

The Migration Museum, originally named Migration and Settlement Museum, is a social history museum located in Adelaide, South Australia. Founded in 1986 as the first museum of migration in Australia, it is one of the three museums operated by the History Trust of South Australia. It deals with the immigration and settlement history of South Australia, and maintains both a permanent and a rotating collection of works. It also runs educational programs and activities.

== History ==
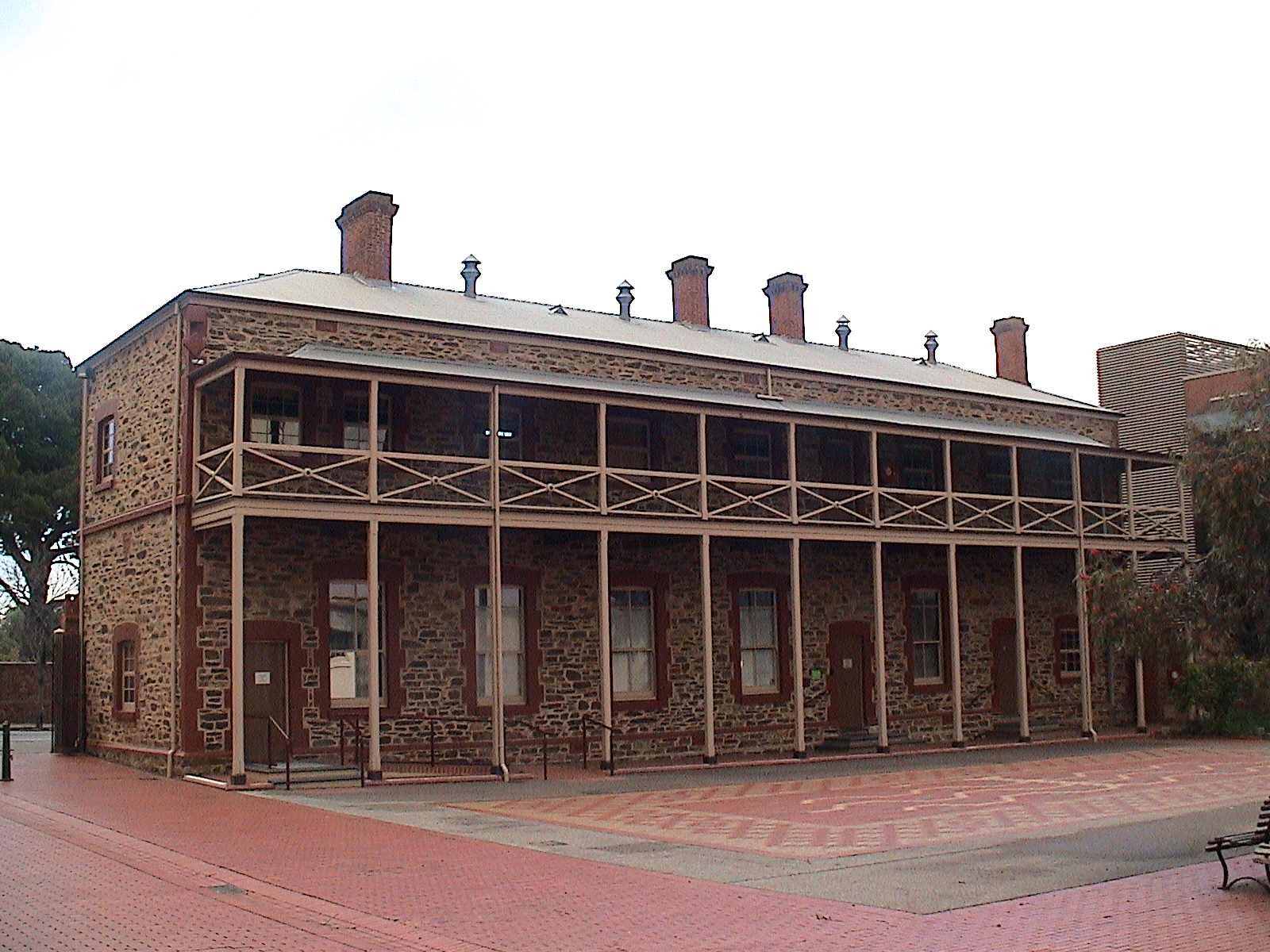
The former Destitute Asylum building

The site on Kintore Avenue was first the location of the "Native School", which aimed to educate Aboriginal children in the early days of the colony. This was the second iteration of the school, and was established by Governor George Grey, who dismantled the previous school in the Park Lands in 1845. He thought it best to take the children away from their parents, and the school taught only in English. The Native School closed in 1851, and the remaining children sent to an Aboriginal reserve.

The site then was used for the city's destitute asylum, the Adelaide Destitute Asylum, until 1918. The Lying-In Home was built in 1878 to house destitute pregnant women, where their babies could be born. (Note: See Lying-in.)

The main building was subsequently used by the SA Government's former Department of Chemistry.

The Migration Museum was founded as an initiative of the state government, after anthropologist and museum curator Robert (Bob) Edwards (1930-2023) recommended the development of an "Ethnic Museum" in his 1981 report on "Museum Policy and Development in South Australia". The History Trust of South Australia was established that year and by 1983 it had plans to create the Migration and Settlement Museum.

The site on Kintore Avenue was chosen, and the existing buildings refurbished and repurposed to house the museum. The museum opened on 23 November 1986. It is the oldest museum of its kind in Australia. (Note: Although this source says that it was a world first, predating the Ellis Island National Museum of Immigration in New York, which opened in 1990, there was an earlier museum, the American Museum of Immigration, which opened in 1972.) The first director was Margaret Anderson.

In 1988, the name was changed to the Migration Museum. Its collection, which began in 1983, has grown mainly through donations.

After Anderson left, curator Viv Szekeres was appointed director, remaining in the position until 2008.

The museum is closed for essential conservation work to the building for 18 months to two years from 1 July 2026.

== Description and governance ==
View from Kintore Avenue

The Migration Museum is located at 82 Kintore Avenue between the State Library of South Australia, the South Australian Museum, and the University of Adelaide, in a complex of early colonial bluestone buildings set around a courtyard. The museum aims to promote cultural diversity and multiculturalism, which they define as including aspects of ethnicity, class, gender, age, and region.

The Migration Museum is one of the three museums operated by the History Trust of South Australia, a statutory body of the South Australian Government.

The Migration Museum Foundation, established in 2000, provides support to the museum from its members, including initiatives such as the Settlement Square pavers in the courtyard and The Immigrants sculpture located here. The museum has forged links with a number of diverse community groups, and it conducts original research as well as mounting exhibitions in collaboration with various other organisations.

The Migration Museum belongs to the US-based International Coalition of Sites of Conscience.

== Collections, exhibitions, and programs ==
Interior (2025)

The museum's collection includes many costumes and documents relating to the migrant experience, cultural heritage, identity, cultural diversity, and societal attitudes towards migrants. Another focus is the impact of the British colonisation of South Australia and subsequent migration on the Aboriginal peoples of South Australia.

The museum has a full program of activities, including education programs for school groups, resources for teachers, public events, and family-friendly fun. A memorial wall at the museum reflects an acknowledgement of the various communities who have sought refuge in Australia, while Settlement Square portrays the arrival of many families and individual settlers and a Reconciliation Plaque notes that the land on which the museum is built was first occupied by the Kaurna people.

Display case (2025)

Its 1998 exhibition, A Twist of Fate, presented topics around refugee migrants to Australia.

In 2011–2012, an exhibition titled "A display on life at the Destitute Asylum" was mounted at the museum, telling "the stories of the women and children who lived and sometimes died here". It also included information about the former Aboriginal school on the site.

One permanent exhibition, titled In This Place, located in the former Lying-in Home of the Destitute Asylum, tells stories of the women and their children. The exhibition spawned the development of an ebook called If walls could speak.

In recent years, its courtyard has served as a venue for Adelaide Fringe events, named the "Courtyard of Curiosities". This will be paused in 2027 to allow for building works.

== Heritage listings ==
Former chapel of the Destitute Asylum (2025)

Four buildings or interiors comprising the migration Museum are state heritage-listed on the South Australian Heritage Register:

- the former Destitute Asylum Lying-in Hospital (now Gallery 8 of the museum);
- the former Destitute Asylum Female Section
- the former Destitute Asylum Store
- the former Destitute Asylum Chapel

== Memorials ==
British Child Migrant Memorial

The British Child Migrant Memorial, created by Tim Thomson and unveiled in 2007, commemorates British child migrants who were transported to South Australia between 1912 and 1967. The plaque reads:

This memorial is dedicated to the British Child Migrants who were taken from their homeland and families and shipped to South Australia between 1912 and 1967.

Alone, they endured many years of hardship and suffering but with courage and determination have survived to make a valuable contribution to South Australia.

Australia is better for their coming.

The Immigrants, 2006

Another bronze sculpture, titled The Immigrants. Julian Stefani, a former MP and member of the Migration Museum Foundation, initiated the idea of this sculpture in 2004, which is placed in Settlement Square and designed to be visible from Kintore Avenue. It was unveiled in 2006 by SA Governor Marjorie Jackson-Nelson, and dedicated by the Lord Mayor of Adelaide, Michael Harbison, on 4 June 2006. It is a companion to a sculpture designed by the same artist, Aurelio Fortelaan, in Asiago, northern Italy, which honours the many Italian migrants who left the country following the Second World War. The sculpture was created through the process of lost-wax fusion by the Guastini Artistic Foundry in Vicenza. It was donated by Adelaide City Council. On the plinth are inscribed the words: "Courage - Pride - Dreams - Achievements". The dedication on the accompanying plaque reads "Dedicated as a tribute to all migrant settlers to South Australia".

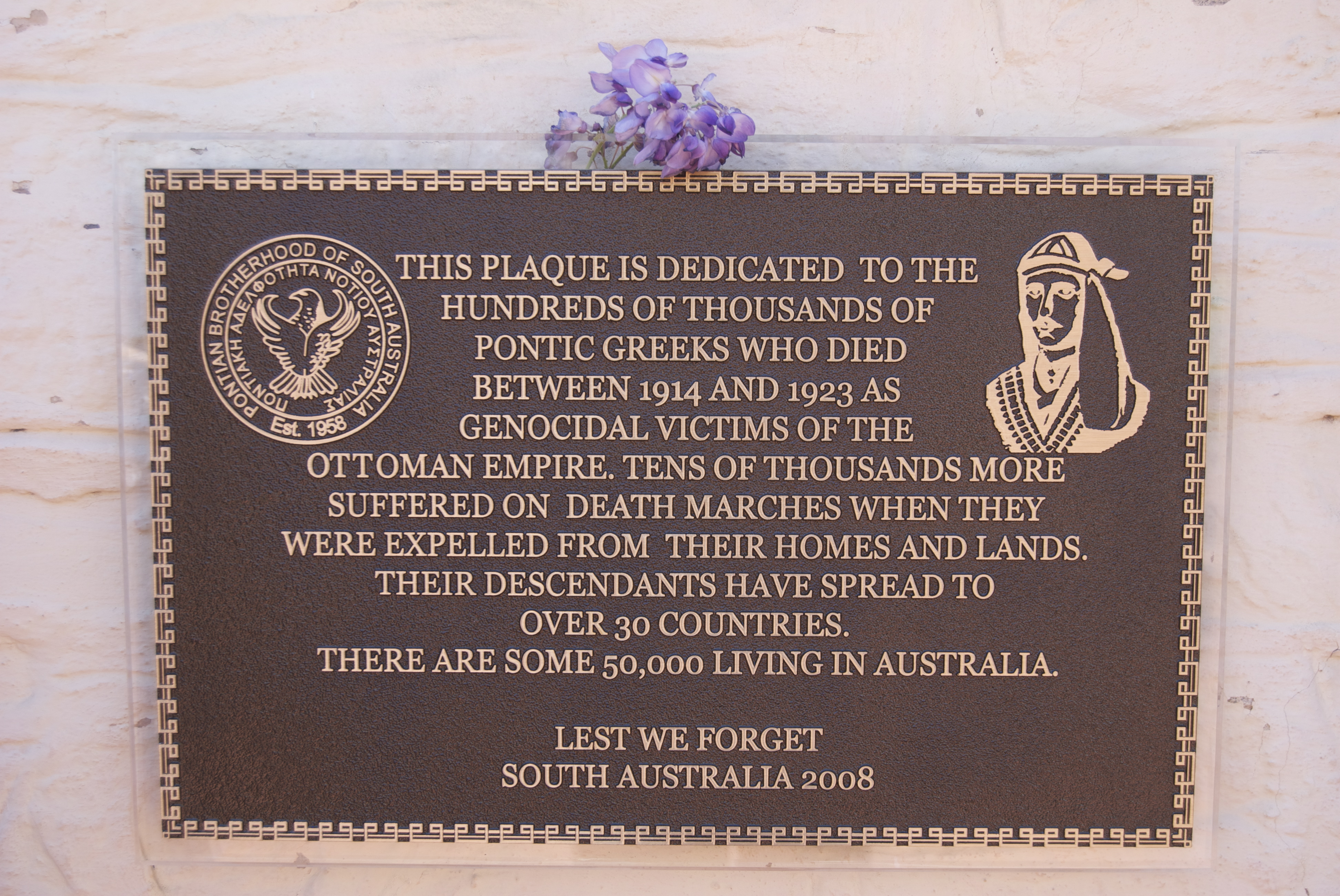
Pontian memorial plaque

There is also a memorial plaque, dated 2008, to the descendants of victims of the Pontian Genocide (1914-1923), when the Ottoman Empire expelled Pontic Greeks from their homeland. Many landed up in Australia.
