= MigratieMuseumMigration =

Migration museum in Brussels, Belgium

MigratieMuseumMigration (MMM)
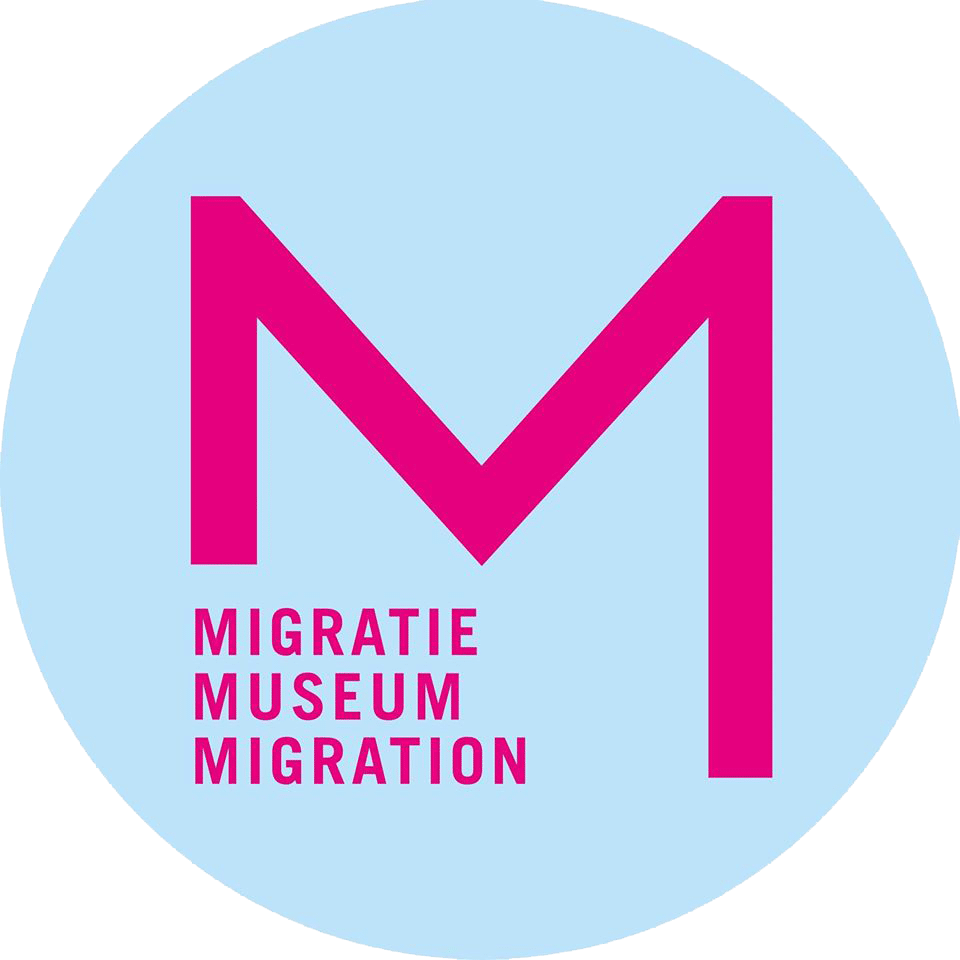
- Interactive fullscreen map
- Established: 12 October 2019; 6 years ago
- Location: Rue des Ateliers / Werkhuizenstraat 17, 1080 Molenbeek-Saint-Jean, Brussels-Capital Region, Belgium
- Coordinates: 50°51′27.32″N 4°20′37.39″E
- Type: Migration museum
- Website: mmm.brussels/en

The MigratieMuseumMigration (MMM) is a migration museum in Molenbeek-Saint-Jean, a municipality of Brussels, Belgium. It was founded in 2019 by the Foyer de Molenbeek-Saint Jean, which was established in 1969. It is one of the 235 (as of 2024) museums to which access is provided by the Belgian national "Museum Pass" and one of the 49 (as of 2024) museums included in the "Brussels Card".

People from about 180 countries live in the Brussels-Capital Region, and the museum presents the history of the first guest workers, the homeless, the war refugees and also the European internal migrants. The museum "pays tribute to the many migrants who have helped shape the city". In 2022, it received the European Heritage Label.

The museum is located at 17, rue des Ateliers/Werkhuizenstraat, close to the Brussels Canal.

== See also ==
- List of museums in Brussels
- History of Brussels
- Culture of Belgium
