= Migration museum =

Type of museum, and list of museums

Migration museums cover human migration in the past, present and future.

== Background ==
The current trend in the development of migration museums, named differently worldwide, is an interesting phenomenon, as it may contribute to the creation of a new and multiple identity, at an individual and collective level. The United States with Ellis Island, Australia, Canada, and more recently several European countries, including France, Germany, Italy, the Netherlands, Portugal, Spain, Switzerland, Belgium, and the United Kingdom — have been creating such venues to facilitate transmission between generations as well as encounters between migrants and the host populations, by telling their personal story.

While these initiatives also serve the duty to remember, they seem to have three main objectives: Acknowledge, integrate and build awareness.

- Acknowledge: The contributions made by migrants to their host societies; the diversity and wealth of the origin cultures and; the right to a dual-belonging.
- Include and Integrate: Foster the sense of belonging; enable the communities to feel as an integral part of the nation; find common ground and contribute to a national identity.
- Build awareness and educate on the events that induced individuals — and refugees in particular — to leave their land, thus developing empathy among the host population. More generally, deconstruct stereotypes on immigration.

Given the international scene and the latest events, from the Van Gogh affair in the Netherlands in 2004 to the so-called ‘crise des banlieues’ in France in 2005there is an urgent need to give the migrant generations (the youth as well as their parents) a voice, in order to foster inclusion, integration and the right to difference. Listening to individual stories may help to deconstruct stereotypes. Memory, History and Narration may also allow to take a step back and to consider the complete picture.

Migration museums also face common challenges, in that they intend to be not only a venue for conservation and exhibition, but also and above all a lively meeting place. The challenge is not so much to bring in the intellectuals, academics, researchers, historians, traditional visitors of museums (the converted) but to attract the general public, those with preconceived ideas on immigration and the migrants themselves.

In addition to the following list, there are many local heritage initiatives and smaller museums which have increasingly focused on migration as a part of the narrative they portray.

== List of migration museums ==
Image	Museum	City	Country	Established
	American Museum of Immigration (closed in 1991)	New York City	United States	1972
	Angel Island Immigration Station museum	Tiburon, California	United States	
	BallinStadt	Hamburg	Germany	2007
	Canadian Museum of Immigration at Pier 21	Halifax, Nova Scotia	Canada	1999
	Cité nationale de l'histoire de l'immigration	Paris	France	2007
	Cobh Heritage Centre	Cobh	Ireland	1993
	Ellis Island National Museum of Immigration	New York City	United States	1990
	The Finnish Migration Museum	Seinajoki	Finland	2004
	Emigration Museum	Gdynia	Poland	2015
	EPIC The Irish Emigration Museum	Dublin	Ireland	2016
	German Emigration Center	Bremerhaven	Germany	2005
	Immigration Museum	Melbourne	Australia	1998
	MigratieMuseumMigration	Brussels	Belgium	2019
	Migration Museum	Adelaide	Australia	1986
	Migration Museum	London	England	2013
	Museum of Immigration and Diversity	London	United Kingdom	
	Museum of the African Diaspora	San Francisco	United States	2005
	Museumand: The National Caribbean Heritage Museum	"Museum without walls"	United Kingdom	2015
	National Museum of Immigration	Buenos Aires	Argentina	
	Swedish Emigrant Institute	Växjö	Sweden	1965
	Western Norway Emigration Center	Sletta, Vestland	Norway	
