= Henry W. Thompson =

Australian politician

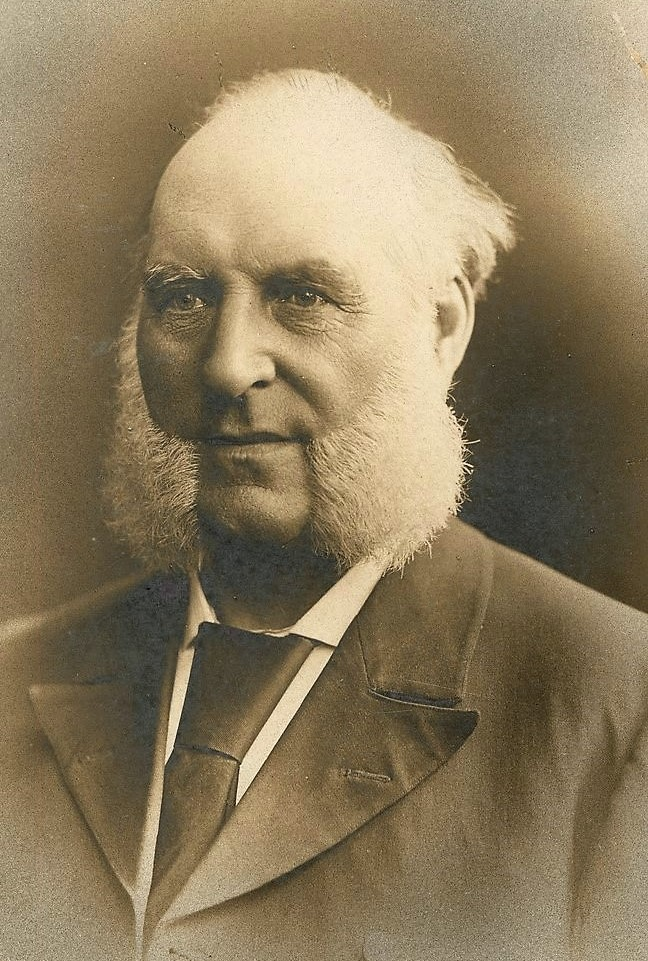

Mayor of Port Adelaide
- In office 1881–1882

Member of the South Australian Legislative Council
- In office 1902–1906

Personal details
- Born: 2 March 1839
- Died: 21 September 1906 (aged 67)

Military service
- Branch/service: Royal Navy

Henry William Thompson (2 March 1839 – 21 September 1906) was a sailor, ship's chandler and politician in the State of South Australia.

== History ==
Thompson was born at Rotherhithe, England, the second son of John Thompson, a London shipbuilder, and was educated at Wick Hall College in Hackney, where he won the silver medal in 1852. He went to sea at an early age, for some time with the West Indies mail service, and in the transport service. In 1854 he joined the Royal Navy, and was signed to the Black Sea fleet, on board H.M.S. Queen, in the Bosphorus for the duration of the Crimean War. He then returned to the mercantile service and served as first mate on the New Margaret until arriving in South Australia in 1860, when he joined the interstate coastal service.

He left the sea, finding employment with Clarke, McKenzie, & Co., ship's chandlers at Port Adelaide, and remained with that firm until 1871, when the business was sold. He married in 1863.

He was for many years a member of the Port Adelaide Council, and was mayor from 1881 to 1882. A. T. Saunders reckoned Thompson and John Formby were the Port's two best mayors. In the early eighties he was involved in the formation of the Naval Reserve, and held the first commission granted in South Australia, serving 8½ years under Captain Walcot. R.N. He retired with the rank of commander.

In 1880 he was appointed a Justice of the Peace, and served on the Destitute Commission 1883–1885 and a charter member of the State Children's Council, serving as its second president. He was a member St. Bede's Anglican Church in Semaphore.

He was a candidate for the seat of Port Adelaide in the House of Assembly, but was unsuccessful, but on 3 May 1902 won a seat in the Legislative Council for the Central district. He died after a long and painful struggle with throat cancer, which had necessitated frequent absences from Parliament. He was buried at the Woodville cemetery.

== Family ==
He married Mary Maguire on 16 May 1863; they had two sons (H. W. and J. T. Thompson) and four daughters (one of whom, Mary Louise, married Archibald J. McClemens on 23 December 1896, lived in Sydney). They lived at Hall street, Semaphore.
