= Emigration Museum =

Museum in Pomeranian Voivodeship, Poland

Emigration Museum in Gdynia

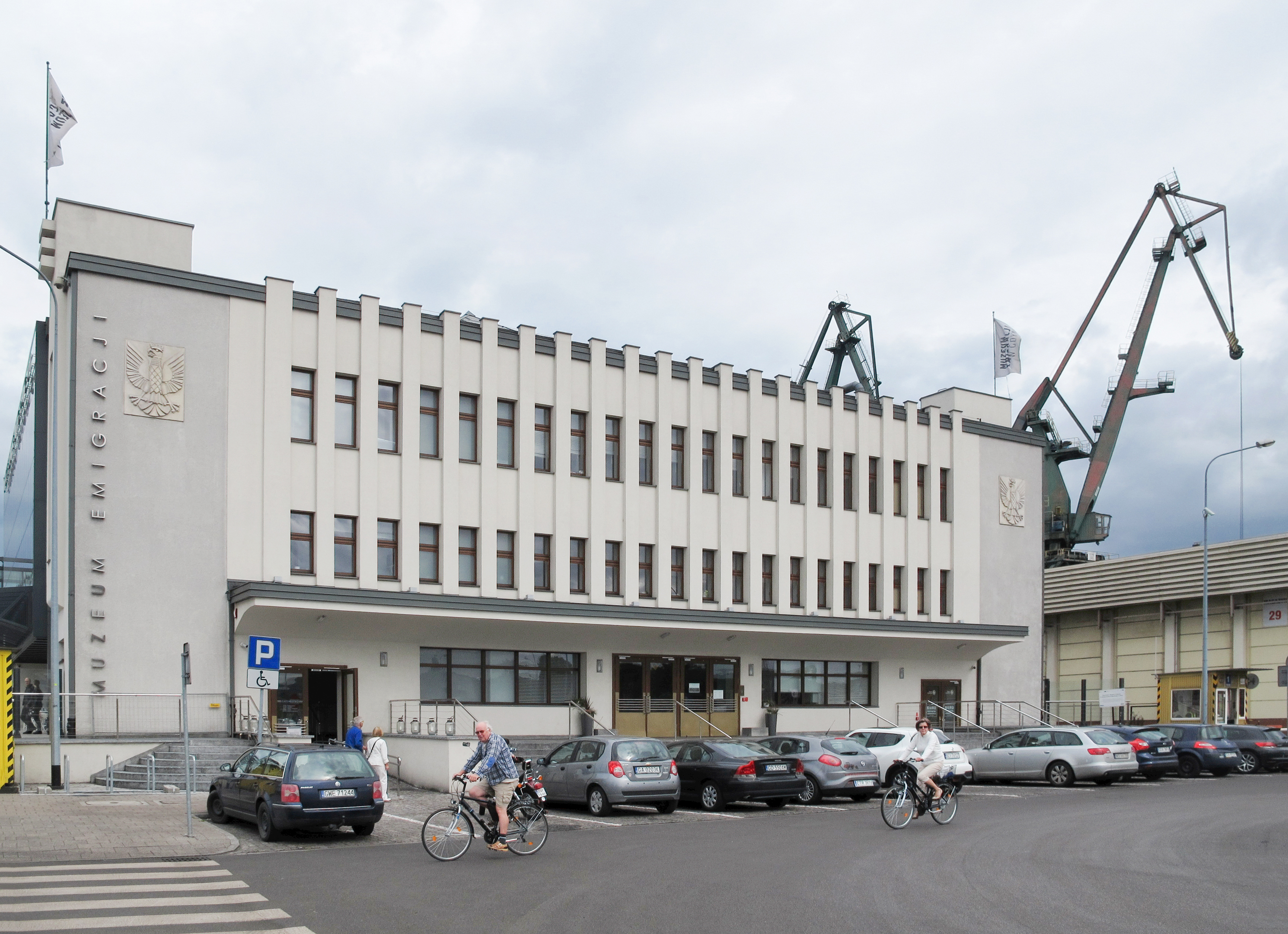
- Sea Terminal in Gdynia
- Established: 2012
- Location: Polska 1, 81-339 Gdynia
- Type: Migration museum
- Website: Official website

The Emigration Museum (in Polish: Muzeum Emigracji) is a museum located in the city of Gdynia, Poland. Opened to the public on 16 May 2015, it showcases 200 years of Polish emigrations, from the 19th century to modern days. It is located in the former Maritime Station, which from the 1930s until 1979 was a transit building from which thousands of Polish emigrants left for their new homelands. The building was refurbished in mid-2014 at a cost of PLN 49.3 million.

In 2018 the Museum received the Živa Award of the Best Slavic Museum by the Forum Slavic Cultures.
