= Polish postmodernism =

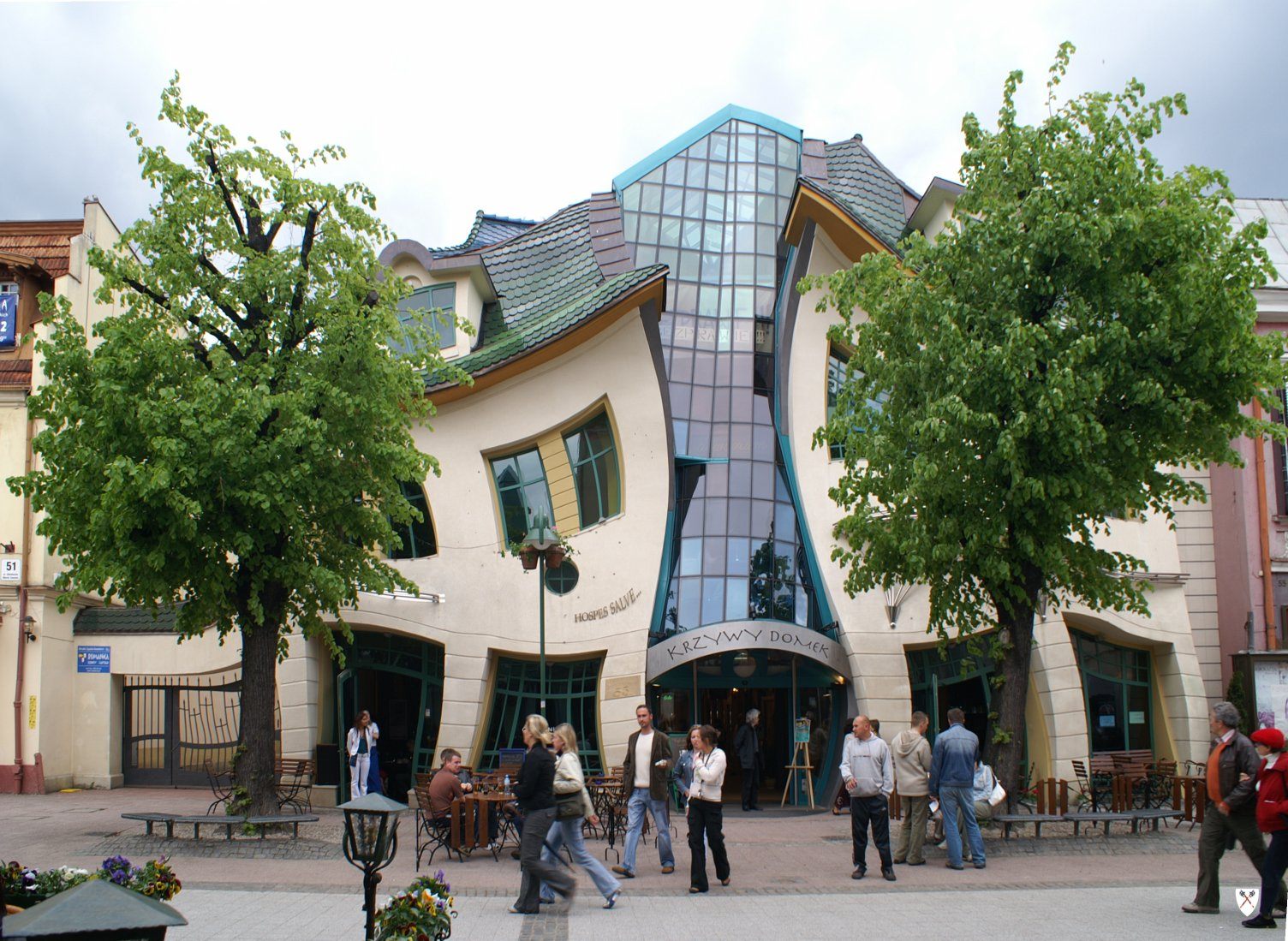
Sopot, Crooked house

Polish postmodernism refers to the cultural, artistic and philosophical development within the Polish society coinciding with the downfall of communism and the democratic transitions leading to Poland's 2004 accession into the European Union.

== Background ==
The discourse on the philosophical concept and literary awareness of postmodernism appeared in Polish criticism long before the collapse of the Soviet Bloc, triggered by numerous publications of writers now characterized as postmodernist, including Borges, Vonnegut, Nabokov as well as Federman, Hawkes and Hassan among others (separate anthologies). Already before the end of the 1970s Samuel Beckett was produced in Poland by over a dozen national theatres in seven metropolitan cities including primary TV broadcast in 1971. His En attendant Godot in translation premiered as far back as 1957 both in Warsaw (at Teatr Współczesny) and in Kraków (Teatr 38). Polish postmodernism can be identified in the work of prolific poet and playwright Tadeusz Różewicz, philosophers Leszek Kołakowski, Stanisław Lem, Tadeusz Kantor, or in the output of various Polish émigré writers such as the Nobel laureate Czesław Miłosz (The Captive Mind) and his contemporaries including Witold Gombrowicz. The basis for the distinctiveness of Polish postmodernism were established avant la lettre already in the Interbellum through controversial, though widely recognized works of Witkacy (the Golden Laurel of PAL, 1935), and Karol Irzykowski among others.

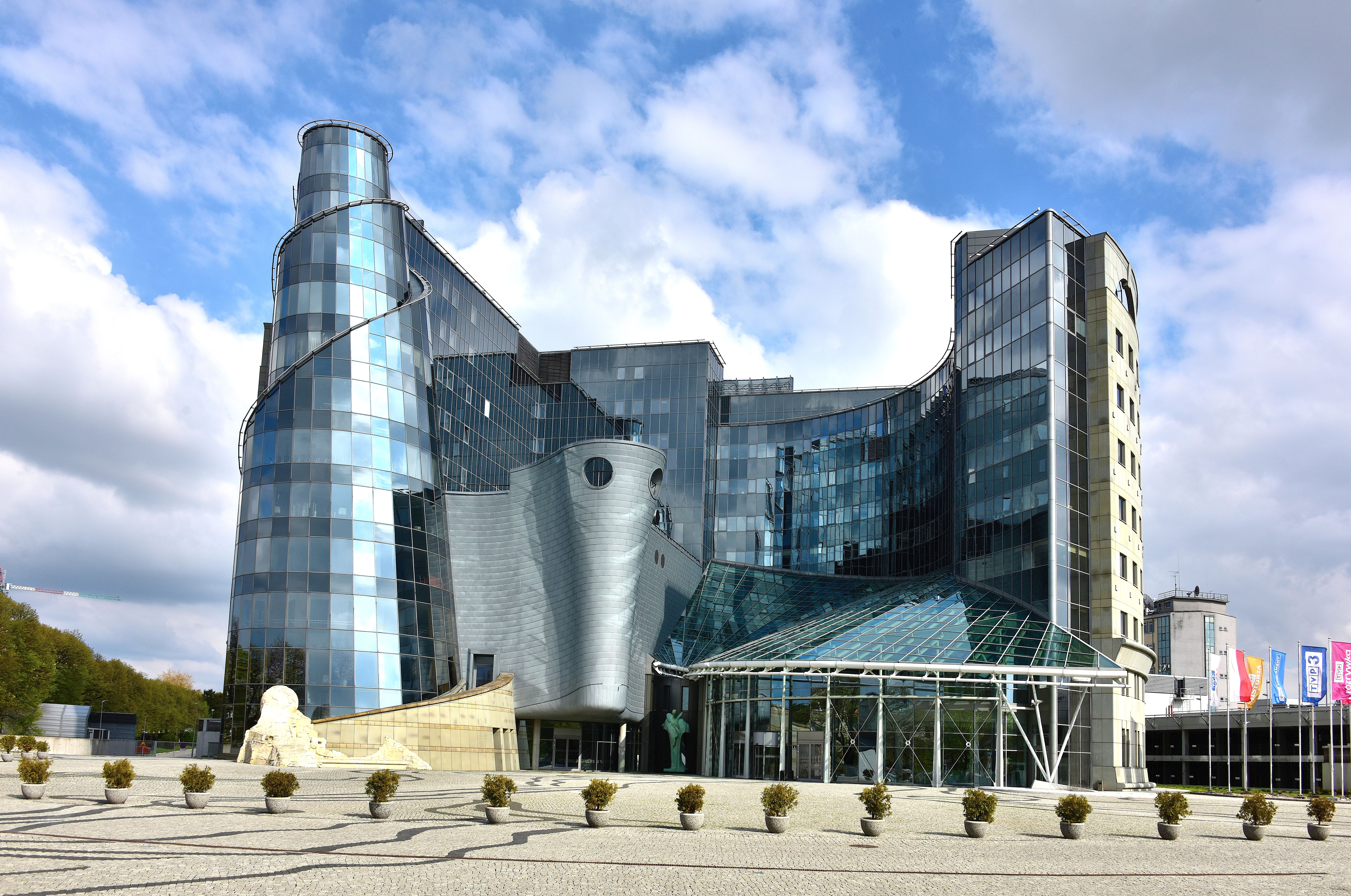
TVP Building in Warsaw

In the Polish context, postmodernism has been categorized by literary critics as the framework of pluralism necessary for the success of European integration as far as post-national diversity and regional differences are concerned.

The official welcome of postmodernism in post-communist Poland was somewhat late; it met with severe impediments not so much from the former communist establishment as from Solidarity itself and the Catholic Church, both of which promoted "collectivist" rather than "liberal" values. However, beginning in the 1990s and throughout the early 21st century, postmodernism began to take a firm hold especially in the realms of poetics and art theory. Polish architects (Czesław Bielecki, TVP; Marek Budzyński) and selected filmmakers (i.e. Kieślowski, Machulski, Agnieszka Holland, Komasa: the Suicide Room) contribute substantially to the Polish postmodernist anti-foundationalism in popular culture.

== Artistic origins ==
Although postmodernism was widely promoted in the so-called Drugi obieg (the Second circulation) by Polish underground press, it has also been criticized as amorphous by both, Catholic philosophers, as well as "fallen Marxists", credited with the emergence of soc-postmodernism in Poland – based on extreme relativism and bitter sense of humor (see Mrożek). The continuous dialog extending well-beyond the Martial law in Poland, eventually led to destruction of the totalitarian ideology, and the inevitable acceptance of pluralism over foundationalism in art theory.

Postmodernism entered Poland in the 1960s at the end of the Stalinist period (with Wróblewski having the greatest impact on postwar figurative painting). It was coupled with the advent of conceptualism, Pop art, as well as neo-expressionism. These new movements – beginning as unofficial political and artistic discourses – challenged the vast matrix of Polish institutionalized culture defined before 1989 by the one-party system and the use of politically charged realism as method of social control.

== See also ==
- History of Poland (1945–1989)
- History of Poland (1989–present)
- Modernism and Postmodernism
- Polish literature
- Socialist realism
