= Magill Youth Training Centre =

Youth detention centre in Adelaide

- Location in South Australia
- Location: 23 Glen Stuart Road, Woodforde, SA; 34°54′28″S 138°41′07″E
- Status: Closed
- Opened: 1869
- Closed: September 2012

The Magill Youth Training Centre (more correctly Magill Training Centre), also known as the Boys Reformatory, McNally Training Centre and South Australian Youth Training Centre (SAYTC) since its founding in 1869, was the last iteration of a series of reformatories or youth detention centres in Woodforde, South Australia. The centre came under criticism in the 2000s for "barbaric" and "degrading" conditions and was replaced by a new 60-bed youth training centre at Cavan in 2012.

== History ==
=== 1869: First institution ===
The first official State institution for children in South Australia, completed in 1869, was the Magill Industrial School, as a home for children who were destitute, neglected, or orphaned, and placed in State care, but not yet placed in foster homes or in employment. They had previously been housed in the Grace Darling Hotel in Brighton. The Girls' Reformatory, Magill, shared the site from 1881 to 1891 as did the Boys' Reformatory, Magill, from 1869 to 1880. Misbehaving boys in the Industrial School were placed in the Reformatory.

=== 1880–1891: The Fitzjames ===
Between 1880 and 1891, the boys were moved to a moored hulk called the Fitzjames at Largs Bay and later further up the Port River (and various other anchorages nearby, depending on the weather), with the girls remaining at Magill. The Fitzjames was a wooden sailing ship built in 1852 which carried more than 1,800 immigrants from England to Australia. After leaking badly in 1866 it was declared unseaworthy and condemned and left to rot on the Yarra River in Melbourne. It was purchased by the South Australian Government in 1876 as a quarantine ship and used to temporarily house immigrants with infectious diseases. Between 1880 and 1891 the hulk was used to house boys convicted of crimes or determined to be "uncontrollable". Pumps were operated by the boys for up to three hours a day to expel water that was leaking into the hulk and keep it from sinking. Because of its poor conditions, the hulk became known as "Hell afloat".

A Royal Commission was ordered into the Destitute Board in 1883, which found the boys at Fitzjames in "pallid and dull appearance" and conditions described as "depressing" with "wearisome monotony of life", "gross improprieties" between younger children and older youths and officers, "deplorable" education standards and "defects in the dietary and want of open-air exercise". The Way Commission tabled its report in State Parliament in 1885. The report recommended Fitzjames' immediate closure and relocation of the boys to a land-based facility. Six years later the boys were removed from the Fitzjames and moved back to the site of the Magill Industrial School.

The Fitzjames was towed up the Port River into the Jervois Basin, where it now rests among a group of other scuttled ships in the Jervois Basin Ships' Graveyard.

=== 1891–1967 ===
In 1891 a new Girls' Reformatory was built in Edwardstown, South Australia, and the Industrial School was moved into the girls' quarters at Magill, once again sharing the site with the Boys' Reformatory. The Training School moved to Edwardstown in 1898 (renamed Glandore in 1949).

=== 1967–2000s ===
In 1967 the site was established as the McNally Training Centre, for boys aged 15–18 sentenced by Juvenile Court or being held on remand. Younger boys aged 9–15 were sent to Brookway Park. In 1979 the McNally Training Centre became the South Australian Youth Training Centre (SAYTC) for youths aged between 15 and 18.

In 1993 the site became the Magill Training Centre to house young people aged 10–14, and the boys aged 15–18 were moved to a new purpose-built facility, the Cavan Training Centre. Young women from the South Australian Youth Remand and Assessment Centre (SAYRAC) were moved to Magill and housed at a separate section of the Centre when SAYRAC closed.

By the 2000s, the department acknowledged the need for a replacement facility for the ageing institution, and incidents at the facility between 2004 and 2008 were investigated for the Children in State Care Commission of Inquiry ("the Mullighan Inquiry").

== Criticisms and controversies ==
In addition to the criticisms of the Fitzjames Reformatory Hulk in the Way Commission Report tabled in South Australian Parliament in 1885, the Adelaide Boys' Reformatory, South Australian Youth Training Centre, McNally Training Centre and Magill Youth Training Centre all received significant public criticism throughout their history. For example, in 1933 a former police superintendent described the then Adelaide Boys' Reformatory as "an institution for bad boys to make others bad."

The South Australian Children's Welfare and Public Relief Board was aware of sexual abuse at the site in the late 1940s and early 1950s.

In 1969, after 10 boys absconded from McNally Training Centre, the superintendent at the time advocated the reintroduction of caning and the Minister of Social Welfare approved the policy, despite objections of the acting director of Social Welfare who held that caning was "degrading" and "contrary to modern methods of treatment of offenders." Boys were placed in "the cabin" or "the dungeon", a solitary confinement cell, for up to 48 hours if they had absconded or were seen as potential absconders. One boy aged 14 held in the centre in the early 1960s reported he was stripped naked and placed in solitary confinement for three days as a punishment for an attempted breakout. By 1983 corporal punishment was prohibited again, although children could still be placed in detention for up to eight hours.

A Commission of Inquiry was held into Children in State Care and Children on APY Lands led by the Hon EP Mullighan QC and tabled in South Australian Parliament in 2008. The commission heard from ten people held in the Magill Reformatory in 1950s and 1960s who were sexually abused or raped by staff and older boys.

The physical conditions were described as "run down", "appalling", and "a very, very sad place", with cells 2 by 3 metres (6 ft 7 in × 9 ft 10 in) in size, and windows too high for small children to see out of.

== Calls for closure ==
After a tour of the site by Australia's Youth Representative to the United Nations, Chris Varney, in 2009, the centre was described as "the worst of its kind" and a "living human rights abuse". In 2009 more than 40 welfare groups and individuals including the executive director of the Youth Affairs Council of South Australia and chief executive officer of Anglicare SA signed an open letter to the South Australian Premier calling for a closure of the site for its appalling conditions and contravention of the United Nations Convention of the Rights of the Child. The South Australian Guardian for Children described the centre as "barbaric", and "a blight on the state" and the Social Inclusion Commission described the conditions there as "deplorable". MP Mark Parnell called it "barbaric" and "degrading".

Amidst these criticisms, the then South Australian Minister for Families and Communities Jennifer Rankine described support available for young offenders as "second to none" and a spokesperson for Rankine stated that while "it's clear the Magill Youth Training Centre needs to be replaced in time" that the state budget "does not provide for that and there will be no change of heart".

The site was closed in 2012, after the announcement of a new $67 million 60-bed facility to be constructed in Cavan to replace the Magill Youth Training Centre and Cavan Training Centre, at Cavan.
