= Henry Palin Gurney =

British educationalist and mathematician (1847–1904)

- The portrait of Henry Palin Gurney by Arthur Hardwick Marsh
- Born: 1847; London, England
- Died: 13 August 1904 (aged 56–57); Arolla, Switzerland
- Education: City of London School, Clare College, Cambridge
- Occupations: Academic, tutor, clergyman
- Employer(s): Wren and Gurney, Durham College of Science
- Known for: Principal of Durham College of Science, co-founder of Wren and Gurney
- Spouse: Louisa Hele (m. 1872)
- Children: 9 daughters
- Parent(s): Henry Gurney and Eleanor Palin

Henry Palin Gurney (1847 – 13 August 1904) was a partner with Walter Wren in Wren and Gurney, the London cramming college which successfully tutored candidates for the Civil Service.

== Life ==
The eldest son of Henry Gurney (son of James Gurney, of Grove House, Upper Holloway), and Eleanor, daughter of Richard Palin, of Artillery Place West, Finsbury, Gurney was born in 1847 in London. After schooling at the City of London School, Gurney went up to Clare College, Cambridge, graduating in 1870 in the mathematics tripos as the 14th wrangler and fourth in class in the natural sciences tripos. From 1870 to 1883 he was a fellow of Clare.

In 1871 Gurney was ordained as priest by Harold Browne, the bishop of Ely and took up the curacy of Rotherhithe. From 1876 to 1886 he was curate of St Peters Kensington.

In 1877 Gurney entered into the partnership for which he became best known with Walter Wren, forming the tutorial college known as Wren and Gurney which specialised in cramming candidates for civil service examinations. The partnership continued until 1894 when he was elected principal of the Durham College of Science and elected to the chair in mathematics.

In 1872, he married Louisa, daughter of Rev. H. Selby Hele, vicar of Grays, Essex; they had nine daughters. Gurney was killed in an accident while climbing alone in Arolla on 13 August 1904.

== Works ==
- Crystallography (1878)
