= List of The Quintessential Quintuplets volumes =

The Quintessential Quintuplets logo

The Quintessential Quintuplets (Japanese: 五等分の花嫁, Hepburn: Go-Tōbun no Hanayome; lit. "Quintuplet Brides"), also known as 5-Tōbun no Hanayome, is a romantic comedy manga series written and illustrated by Negi Haruba. It began serialization in Kodansha's Weekly Shōnen Magazine on August 9, 2017, and was published digitally in English by Kodansha USA under their Kodansha Comics imprint from June 26, 2018, to August 11, 2020. The physical release began on December 31, 2018. The story is told through flashbacks from the wedding day of Futaro and one of the quintuplets to their time as tutor and students.

== Main series ==
No.	Original release date	Original ISBN	English release date	English ISBN
1	October 17, 2017; April 17, 2020	978-4-06-510249-7 (original edition); 978-4-06-519515-4 (colored edition)	June 26, 2018; December 31, 2018	978-1-64-212302-9 (digital edition); 978-1-63-236774-7 (physical edition)
1. "The Quintessential Quintuplets" (五等分の花嫁, Go-tōbun no Hanayome); 2. "Home Visit" (お宅訪問, Otaku Houmon); 3. "Rooftop Confession" (屋上の告白, Okujou no Kokuhaku); 4. "100 Points Combined" (合計１００点, Goukei Hyaku Ten); 5. "The Problems Keep Piling Up" (問題は山積み, Mondai wa Yamazumi)
Through an arrangement between their fathers, top high school student Uesugi Futaro becomes a tutor to failing students Itsuki, Ichika, Nino, Miku and Yotsuba. The girls initially refuse to accept him and he must arouse their interest in studying for their benefit and to help his family overcome a debt. One day, Futaro raises a Japanese history question to them; Miku calls Futaro to the rooftop to privately hear her answer, which he misapprehends as a love confession, and which in turn arouses the discontent of Nino. While considering how to win over Nino, he pushes her down to prevent her injury, and Itsuki takes a photo of the scene.
2	December 15, 2017; May 15, 2020	978-4-06-510814-7 (original edition); 978-4-06-519516-1 (colored edition)	July 24, 2018; March 5, 2019	978-1-64-212321-0 (digital edition); 978-1-63-236775-4 (physical edition)
6. "Open The Door" (扉を開けて, Tobira o Akete); 7. "Our Day Off 1" (今日はお休み１, Kyouha Oyasumi Ichi); 8. "Our Day Off 2" (今日はお休み２, Kyouha Oyasumi Ni); 9. "Our Day Off 3" (今日はお休み３, Kyouha Oyasumi San); 10. "Our Day Off 4" (今日はお休み４, Kyouha Oyasumi Yon); 11. "Our Day Off 5" (今日はお休み５, Kyouha Oyasumi Go); 12. "Our Day Off 6" (今日はお休み６, Kyouha Oyasumi Roku); 13. "The Amiable Pushover" (人好きのお人好し, Hitozuki no Ohitoyoshi); 14. "The Picture that Started it All" (始まりの写真, Hajimari no Shashin)
The quintuplets discuss whether Futaro should continue as their tutor. Miku helps Futaro explain and he is forgiven by the quintuplets, except for Nino. On another day, Itsuki visits Futaro's home to pay his tutoring fee, and they go shopping with Futaro's sister Raiha. They meet the other quintuplets and all go to a fireworks festival together, where Futaro improves his relationship with the quintuplets. Afterwards, they exchange emails, but while writing in his student handbook Nino happens to see a photo from his childhood. Folded on the back of the photo is a picture of a girl he'd met during a primary school trip to Kyoto, which appears to be one of the quintuplets.
3	March 16, 2018; June 17, 2020	978-4-06-511075-1 (original edition); 978-4-06-520444-3 (colored edition)	August 28, 2018; May 21, 2019	978-1-64-212397-5 (digital edition); 978-1-63-236776-1 (physical edition)
15. "What They Have Accumulated" (積み上げたもの, Tsumiageta Mono); 16. "Stubborn" (いじっぱり, Ijippari); 17. "The Night Study Group" (夜の勉強会, Yoru no Benkyoukai); 18. "Futaro The Lying Liar" (嘘つき嘘たろう, Usotsuki Usotarou); 19. "The Death Road of Panic" (焦りのデスロード, Aseri no Desurodo); 20. "The Midterms" (中間試験, Chuukanshiken); 21. "The Magical Spell" (おまじない, Omajinai); 22. "The Binding Legend" (結びの伝説, Musubi no Densetsu); 23. "The Sextet's School Camping Trip" (６人の林間学校, Rokunin no Rinkangakkou)
The quintuplets' father tells Futaro that if any of them fails their mid-term examination, Futaro must resign as their tutor. He doesn't want to part with them but his tsundere aloofness causes Itsuki to change her attitude toward him. To ensure their best chances, Futaro decides to stay overnight for a study session. Nino learns of Futaro's possible resignation and becomes discontent. In the morning, Futaro finds Miku is sleeping beside him, and mistakes her for Itsuki. Later, he pretends to have mistaken Itsuki for Miku, allowing her to accept his tutoring help without losing face. Although none of the quintuplets pass more than one subject, Nino deceives her father to help Futaro through the crisis. They determine to make an effort to perform better. After Raiha recovers from an illness, the quintuplets take Futaro to head for the school camping trip.
4	May 17, 2018; July 17, 2020	978-4-06-511416-2 (original edition); 978-4-06-520617-1 (colored edition)	September 25, 2018; July 16, 2019	978-1-64-212476-7 (digital edition); 978-1-63-236853-9 (physical edition)
24. "The Binding Legend: First Day" (結びの伝説 初日, Musubi no Densetsu Shonichi); 25. "The Binding Legend: Day Two (1)" (結びの伝説 ２日目１, Musubi no Densetsu Futsukame Ichi); 26. "The Binding Legend: Day Two (2)" (結びの伝説 ２日目２, Musubi no Densetsu Futsukame Ni); 27. "The Binding Legend: Day Two (3)" (結びの伝説 ２日目３, Musubi no Densetsu Futsukame San); 28. "The Binding Legend: Day Two (4)" (結びの伝説 ２日目４, Musubi no Densetsu Futsukame Yon); 29. "The Binding Legend: Day Three (1)" (結びの伝説 ３日目１, Musubi no Densetsu Mikkame Ichi); 30. "The Binding Legend: Day Three (2)" (結びの伝説 ３日目２, Musubi no Densetsu Mikkame Ni); 31. "The Binding Legend: Day Three (3)" (結びの伝説 ３日目３, Musubi no Densetsu Mikkame San); 32. "The Binding Legend: Day 2000" (結びの伝説 ２０００日目, Musubi no Densetsu Nisennichime)
Futaro becomes closer to the quintuplets on the first day of the school camping trip, especially to Miku who tries to monopolize him but has to follow the "Quintuplets Equal" rule. Nino becomes lost during the test of courage; Futaro finds her while wearing a blonde fright wig, and she recognizes him as the boy in the photo and expresses her feelings for him, not realizing he is Futaro. Later, Futaro helps Ichika move logs for the bonfire after which they are locked in the woodshed; Ichika is conscious of her affection for Futaro but they are interrupted by Miku and Itsuki. After skiing on the third day, Futaro falls ill. Each of the quintuplets sneak in to see him during the bonfire dance, which has a legend of uniting couples. A flashforward suggests that Futaro will marry one of the quintuplets, then the story returns to show all five quintuplets holding Futaro's hand, to give them equal chances in love.
5	July 17, 2018; August 17, 2020	978-4-06-511988-4 (original edition); 978-4-06-521005-5 (colored edition)	October 23, 2018; September 24, 2019	978-1-64-212509-2 (digital edition); 978-1-63-236854-6 (physical edition)
33. "The Hospital Encounter" (お見舞いエンカウント, Omimai Enkaunto); 34. "Today and Kyoto's Tough Luck and Togetherness" (今日の京都と凶と共, Kyou no Kyōto to Kyou to Kyou); 35. "Detective Futaro and Five Suspects" (探偵風太郎と五人の容疑者たち, Tantei Fuutarou to Gonin no Yougisha Tachi); 36. "The Labor Thanksgiving Tour 1" (勤労感謝ツアー１, Kinroukansha Tsuā Ichi); 37. "The Labor Thanksgiving Tour 2" (勤労感謝ツアー２, Kinroukansha Tsuā Ni); 38. "The Living Room Confession" (リビングルームの告白, Ribingurūmu no Kokuhaku); 39. "The Seven Goodbyes 1" (七つのさよなら１, Nanatsu no Sayonara Ichi); 40. "The Seven Goodbyes 2" (七つのさよなら２, Nanatsu no Sayonara Ni); 41. "The Seven Goodbyes 3" (七つのさよなら３, Nanatsu no Sayonara San)
Ill Futaro is sent to hospital, where he recounts to Itsuki the day he encountered the girl in the photo and why he studies so much. Futaro spends Labour Thanksgiving Day with Yotsuba after declining Ichika and Miku; he hides when they come across these two sisters at the shopping centre, and avoid Itsuki and Nino outside. They enjoy a moment in a park. Examinations approach, and Futaro tries to keep the quintuplets focused on their studies. However, a quarrel leads to Nino and Itsuki both moving out, while Yotsuba is pressured into club activities. While Futaro questions his abilities, the girl from five years ago appears to him.
6	September 14, 2018; September 17, 2020	978-4-06-512607-3 (original edition); 978-4-06-521146-5 (colored edition)	February 5, 2019; November 5, 2019	978-1-64-212653-2 (digital edition); 978-1-63-236855-3 (physical edition)
42. "The Seven Goodbyes 4" (七つのさよなら４, Nanatsu no Sayonara Yon); 43. "The Seven Goodbyes 5" (七つのさよなら５, Nanatsu no Sayonara Go); 44. "The Seven Goodbyes 6" (七つのさよなら６, Nanatsu no Sayonara Roku); 45. "The Seven Goodbyes 7" (七つのさよなら７, Nanatsu no Sayonara Nana); 46. "The Seven Goodbyes 8" (七つのさよなら８, Nanatsu no Sayonara Hachi); 47. "The Seven Goodbyes 9" (七つのさよなら９, Nanatsu no Sayonara Ku); 48. "The Seven Goodbyes 10" (七つのさよなら１０, Nanatsu no Sayonara Juu); 49. "The Seven Goodbyes 11" (七つのさよなら１１, Nanatsu no Sayonara Juuichi); 50. "The Seven Goodbyes 12" (七つのさよなら１２, Nanatsu no Sayonara Juuni)
The girl from Kyoto, who calls herself Rena, tells Futaro that they will not meet again. She exchanges his photo of her for a charm she had bought, telling him to open it once he's satisfied with himself. Futaro falls into a river, then goes to Nino's hotel and is so dejected that she takes him in; she cries when he explains the loss he experienced. Understanding Nino better, he wears the blonde wig again to give Nino closure, but she deduces his identity and moves to another hotel. Miku persuades Nino to come home, and Nino and Itsuki reconcile. Various quintuplets impersonate Yotsuba to have her quit the demanding track team; Yotsuba gains the determination to apologize and quit on her own. None of the quintuplets pass the exam, and Futaro leaves them with some heartfelt advice before resigning as tutor and being barred from their home. The quintuples scheme for away to get him back, and on Christmas Eve they move into an apartment rented with Ichika's savings.
7	December 17, 2018; October 16, 2020	978-4-06-513250-0 (original edition); 978-4-06-521148-9 (colored edition)	April 30, 2019; January 28, 2020	978-1-64-212819-2 (digital edition); 978-1-63-236899-7 (physical edition)
51. "First Spring" (初の春, Hatsu no Haru); 52. "Good Work Today 1" (今日はお疲れ１, Kyou wa Otsukare Ichi); 53. "Good Work Today 2" (今日はお疲れ２, Kyou wa Otsukare Ni); 54. "The Fools' Battle" (愚者の戦い, Gusha no Tatakai); 55. "If the Last Exam Was Miku's" (最後の試験が三玖の場合, Saigo no Shiken ga Miku no Baai); 56. "If the Last Exam Was Yotsuba's" (最後の試験が四葉の場合, Saigo no Shiken ga Yotsuba no Baai); 57. "If the Last Exam Was Itsuki's" (最後の試験が五月の場合, Saigo no Shiken ga Itsuki no Baai); 58. "If the Last Exam Was Ichika's" (最後の試験が一花の場合, Saigo no Shiken ga Ichika no Baai); 59. "If the Last Exam Was Nino's" (最後の試験が二乃の場合, Saigo no Shiken ga Nino no Baai)
Ichika becomes exhausted with acting jobs to pay for the household; Futaro chooses to support her after witnessing her effort filming a scene at his part-time job. The quintuplets' father asks them to return home and study under a professional tutor, with Futaro assisting. They refuse, but if any of them fail their final exams they must all transfer to a school in Tokyo. They study intensively and tutor each other in their best subject: Miku hopes that her exam scores will give her the courage to confess to Futaro. Yotsuba overcomes her guilt for having caused the quintuplets' previous transfer. Itsuki aspires to become a teacher, like her late mother. Ichika considers her feelings for Futaro and exceeds Miku's position as the top student among the quintuplets. After the exams, Nino meets her father and refuses to move back home; Futaro interrupts and takes her via motorcycle to celebrate with the other quintuplets; she sees Futaro's exam results, a personal low of 459 out of 500. As they ride away, Nino confesses to Futaro.
8	February 15, 2019; November 17, 2020	978-4-06-514125-0 (original edition); 978-4-06-521149-6 (colored edition)	June 4, 2019; March 10, 2020	978-1-64-212894-9 (digital edition); 978-1-63-236919-2 (physical edition)
60. "Commence Assault" (攻略開始, Kouryaku Kaishi); 61. "Scrambled Eggs 1" (スクランブルエッグ１, Sukuramburu Eggu Ichi); 62. "Scrambled Eggs 2" (スクランブルエッグ２, Sukuramburu Eggu Ni); 63. "Scrambled Eggs 3" (スクランブルエッグ３, Sukuramburu Eggu San); 64. "Scrambled Eggs 4" (スクランブルエッグ４, Sukuramburu Eggu Yon); 65. "Scrambled Eggs 5" (スクランブルエッグ５, Sukuramburu Eggu Go); 66. "Scrambled Eggs 6" (スクランブルエッグ６, Sukuramburu Eggu Roku); 67. "Scrambled Eggs 7" (スクランブルエッグ７, Sukuramburu Eggu Nana); 68. "Scrambled Eggs 8" (スクランブルエッグ８, Sukuramburu Eggu Hachi)
Nino repeats her confession to Futaro. This is overheard by Ichika, who was about to confess as well. Futaro is unable to concentrate on his studies. He wins a spring break trip, which takes his family to the same inn as the quintuplets and their father. The girls are distant and all dress like Itsuki (to please their grandfather); one of them tells Futaro to end their student-teacher relationship. Futaro can't tell them apart which worsens his situation. Ichika becomes further conflicted when Nino asks for help to become Futaro's girlfriend, while Yotsuba advises Ichika to follow her heart. Miku admits to Istuki that she impersonated Itsuki to change their relationship with Futaro, because she loves him. Futaro cannot deduce her identity but has an impression that she is Miku, which pulls her from her depression. Before leaving, Futaro is approached by a quintuplet dressed like Itsuki, who pushes him down and kisses him under a promise bell, which is said to bind couples in eternal love. At the wedding, Futaro considers that he first thought of his bride as special on the final day of the trip.
9	April 17, 2019; December 17, 2020	978-4-06-514879-2 (original edition); 978-4-06-521150-2 (colored edition)	July 16, 2019; July 14, 2020	978-1-64-212963-2 (digital edition); 978-1-63-236920-8 (physical edition)
69. "Welcome to Class 3-1" (ようこそ3年1組, Yōkoso San Nen Ichi Kumi); 70. "A Class Officer's Job" (学級長のお仕事, Gakkyūchō no Oshigoto); 71. "Advantage" (アドバンテージ, Adobantēji); 72. "Rumors" (学級長の噂, Gakkyūchō no Uwasa); 73. "The New Battle of Kawanakajima" (新川中島, Shin Kawanakajima) (Note: The title of this chapter alldes to "Battles of Kawanakajima", implying a focus on the rivalry between Fūtarō Uesugi and Yūsuke Takeda.); 74. "Throwing A Curve Ball" (変化球勝負, Henkakyū Shōbu); 75. "Five Paper Cranes in Return" (五羽鶴の恩返し, Gowazuru no Ongaeshi); 76. "The Men's Battle" (男の戦, Otoko no Ikusa); 77. "The Women's Battle" (女の戦, Onna no Ikusa)
The quintuplets take part-time jobs as they enter the final year of high school. Nino works with Futaro and they discuss her unanswered confession, while a rumour spreads that Yotsuba is his girlfriend. Ichika impersonates Miku and tells Futaro that Ichika loves him. The quintuplets' father seeks to replace Futaro with their classmate Yusuke Takeda, who became top of their class after Futaro's grades slipped. Futaro regains his salaried position by ranking third in the national mock examination. The quintuplets plan to advance at love during an upcoming school trip to Kyoto. Itsuki is troubled by a secret and is hiding Rena's clothes, while Ichika finds the childhood photo Itsuki had taken from Futaro.
10	June 17, 2019; January 15, 2021	978-4-06-515308-6 (original edition); 978-4-06-521151-9 (colored edition)	September 17, 2019; September 1, 2020	978-1-64-659038-4 (digital edition); 978-1-63-236996-3 (physical edition)
78. "Sisters' War: Round 1" (シスターズウォー 一回戦, Shisutāzu Wō Ikkai Sen); 79. "Sisters' War: Round 2" (シスターズウォー 二回戦, Shisutāzu Wō Ni Kai Sen); 80. "Sisters' War: Round 3" (シスターズウォー 三回戦, Shisutāzu Wō San Kai Sen); 81. "Sisters' War: Round 4" (シスターズウォー 四回戦, Shisutāzu Wō Yon Kai Sen); 82. "Sisters' War: Round 5" (シスターズウォー 五回戦, Shisutāzu Wō Go Kai Sen); 83. "Sisters' War: Round 6" (シスターズウォー 六回戦, Shisutāzu Wō Rokkai Sen); 84. "Sisters' War: Round 7" (シスターズウォー 七回戦, Shisutāzu Wō Nana Kai Sen); 85. "Sisters' War: Round 7 (Behind the Scenes)" (シスターズウォー 七回戦（裏）, Shisutāzu Wō Nana Kai Sen (Ura)); 86. "Sisters' War: Exhibition Match" (シスターズウォー エキシビションマッチ, Shisutāzu Wō Ekishibishon Macchi)
Nino boldly claims Futaro for the Kyoto school trip, stunning Ichika and Miku, but Futaro has made other plans. Itsuki appears to Futaro as Rena (her mother's name) but he is disinterested in the game. Ichika twice disguises herself as Miku to sabotage her relationship with Futaro, but is caught first by the sisters and then by Futaro. Ichika claims to be the Rena he met years ago, but he tells her she's lying as he still has the charm, states he can't believe anything she says anymore and he leaves her behind in the rain, devastating her. On the third day, to make up for what she did, Ichika makes sure Miku spends the last day of the Kyoto trip alone with Futaro. They both spend time alone in period costumes, and Miku is able to express her love for him; or perhaps for the sisters who aided her and repair their bonds. Ichika apologizes to Miku and she forgives her, while Futaro later apologizes to Ichika for being harsh to her. Ichika kisses him on the cheek, stating that "everything was a lie". Itsuki wears the Rena disguise to accept a birthday gift from Futaro, and it is revealed that the girl he'd met six years ago was Yotsuba.
11	September 17, 2019; February 17, 2021	978-4-06-516335-1 (original edition); 978-4-06-521153-3 (colored edition)	January 21, 2020; November 17, 2020	978-1-64-659215-9 (digital edition); 978-1-64-651060-3 (physical edition)
87. "My Sisters and I 1" (私と姉妹１, Watashi to Shimai Ichi); 88. "This Boy and I 1" (私とある男子１, Watashi to aru Danshi Ichi); 89. "My Sisters and I 2" (私と姉妹２, Watashi to Shimai Ni); 90. "This Boy and I 2" (私とある男子２, Watashi to aru Danshi Ni); 91. "A Summer Vacation Without Coincidences" (偶然のない夏休み, Gūzen no nai Natsu-yasumi); 92. "Secret Tanlines" (秘密の痕, Himitsu no Ato); 93. "Tsun-Dere-Tsun" (ツンデレツン, Tsun Dere Tsun); 94. "The Time for Divergence 1" (分枝の時１, Bunshi no Toki Ichi); 95. "The Time for Divergence 2" (分枝の時２, Bunshi no Toki Ni)
Six years ago on school trips to Kyoto, Yotsuba became separated and helped Futaro out of a bad situation. The two bonded over their family circumstances and future aspirations, promising to study. However, Yotsuba sees Futaro mistake Ichika for her, and decides to stand out from her sisters. Soon after, their mother dies and their adoptive father moves them to prestigious schools. Yotsuba's grades slip and she loses motivation to study, instead becoming popular through sports. She fails a make-up exam and her sisters pretend to cheat to follow her to a new school. There, Yotsuba hid the fact that she had met Futaro before – initially because she was a poor student, and later as she realized her sisters had feelings for him. Yotsuba had Itsuki pretend to be Rena, so that he would not be tied by their past, but in the present of the storyline Yotsuba admits to herself that she had always loved Futaro. During summer break, Futaro realizes that the quintuplets helped him socialize with the class. Ichika decides to drop out of school to focus on her acting career, but Futaro convinces her to accept his tutoring and graduate with her class.
12	November 15, 2019; March 17, 2021	978-4-06-517312-1 (original edition); 978-4-06-521154-0 (colored edition)	April 21, 2020; January 5, 2021	978-1-64-659294-4 (digital edition); 978-1-64-651061-0 (physical edition)
96. "Their Normal Life Marches On" (進み続ける日常, Susumi-tsuzukeru Nichijō); 97. "Their Normal Life Begins to Change" (変わり始める日常, Kawari-hajimeru Nichijō); 98. "Their Normal Life Begins to End" (終わり掛ける日常, Owari-kakeru Nichijō); 99. "Sunrise Festival First day" (日の出祭 初日, Hi no De-sai Shonichi); 100. "Sunrise Festival Day Two" (日の出祭 二日目, Hi no De-sai Futsuka-me); 101. "If the Final Festival Was Ichika's 1" (最後の祭りが一花の場合１, Saigo no Matsuri ga Ichika no Baai Ichi); 102. "If the Final Festival Was Ichika's 2" (最後の祭りが一花の場合２, Saigo no Matsuri ga Ichika no Baai Ni); 103. "If the Final Festival Was Nino's 1" (最後の祭りが二乃の場合１, Saigo no Matsuri ga Nino no Baai Ichi); 104. "If the Final Festival Was Nino's 2" (最後の祭りが二乃の場合２, Saigo no Matsuri ga Nino no Baai Ni)
Futaro's class is divided on a food stall for the school festival, with the boys and Nino favouring takoyaki while the girls would rather make pancakes. Itsuki is troubled by a bad grade and her prospects of entering university. Miku asks Futaro on a date and tells him that she's going to culinary school. On the first day of the festival, he tells the girls that he likes all five, and will give them a proper answer at the end of the festival, though he tells Ichika that he isn't picking any of them. The next day, Futaro meets Takebayashi, his elementary school classmate and tutor, who talks with some of the quintuplets. Ichika spends the evening with Futaro and kisses him. Nino, who tried to invite her stepfather to the festival, is aided by Futaro and makes pancakes for him, sneakily kissing Futaro. It is revealed that her stepfather and Futaro's father were her mother's students.
13	January 17, 2020; April 16, 2021	978-4-06-518452-3 (original edition); 978-4-06-521152-6 (colored edition)	July 14, 2020; March 30, 2021	978-1-64-659595-2 (digital edition); 978-1-64-651062-7 (physical edition)
105. "If the Final Festival Was Miku's 1" (最後の祭りが三玖の場合１, Saigo no Matsuri ga Miku no Baai Ichi); 106. "If the Final Festival Was Miku's 2" (最後の祭りが三玖の場合２, Saigo no Matsuri ga Miku no Baai Ni); 107. "If the Final Festival Was Yotsuba's 1" (最後の祭りが四葉の場合１, Saigo no Matsuri ga Yotsuba no Baai Ichi); 108. "If the Final Festival Was Yotsuba's 2" (最後の祭りが四葉の場合２, Saigo no Matsuri ga Yotsuba no Baai Ni); 109. "If the Final Festival Was Itsuki's 1" (最後の祭りが五月の場合１, Saigo no Matsuri ga Itsuki no Baai Ichi); 110. "If the Final Festival Was Itsuki's 2" (最後の祭りが五月の場合２, Saigo no Matsuri ga Itsuki no Baai Ni); 111. "If the Final Festival Was Itsuki's 3" (最後の祭りが五月の場合３, Saigo no Matsuri ga Itsuki no Baai San); 112. "If the Final Festival Was the Quints'" (最後の祭りが五つ子の場合, Saigo no Matsuri ga Itsutsu-Go no Baai); 113. "If the Final Festival Was Futaro's 1" (最後の祭りが風太郎の場合１, Saigo no Matsuri ga Fūtarō no Baai Ichi)
As with Nino, the other quintuplets face challenges at the festival and some of them kiss Futaro for his support, except for Itsuki. Miku has the boys and girls reconcile and collaborate for the class's food stand. Yotsuba collapses from overwork, and heeds Futaro's advice to rest after learning that those she had helped would cover for her. Itsuki's determination is upset by Mudou, the quintuplets' biological father, who begs forgiveness and urges Itsuki to not follow in the footsteps of her mother, his former student. After talking to Futaro on the last day of the festival, Itsuki approaches the man once more, supported by her sisters and stepfather, and states that she will pursue her dream of becoming a teacher even if her own mother told her not to. At the festival's conclusion, Futaro is told by the quintuplets to go into the room of the girl he wants to date. He goes to the infirmary where Yotsuba is waiting, choosing her over the rest of her sisters.
14	April 17, 2020; May 17, 2021	978-4-06-518687-9 (regular edition); 978-4-06-519722-6 (limited edition); 978-4-06-521155-7 (colored edition)	August 11, 2020; July 20, 2021	978-1-64-659635-5 (digital edition); 978-1-64-651163-1 (physical edition)
114. "If the Final Festival Was Futaro's 2" (最後の祭りが風太郎の場合２, Saigo no Matsuri ga Fūtarō no Baai Ni); 115. "Five Mornings" (五通りの朝, Itsu-dōri no Asa); 116. "Five Hours, One Room" (五時間一部屋, Gojikan Hitoheya); 117. "Five-Alarm Lunchtime" (五里霧中ランチタイム, Gorimuchū ranchitaimu); 118. "The Fifth Sister's Memories" (五月の思い出, Itsuki no Omoide); 119. "Five-Star Tour" (五つ星ツアー, Itsutsu-boshi Tsuā); 120. "Five Years Ago, On That Day" (五年前のとある日, Gonen-mae no to Aru Hi); 121. "One in Five Chance" (五分の一の確率, Gobun no Ichi no Kakuritsu); 122. "The Quintessential Quintuplets" (五等分の花嫁, Go-Tōbun no Hanayome)
Refusing to accept Futaro's choice, Yotsuba runs away, but admits her feelings for him. However, she can't return his feelings until she settlies things with her sisters. The day after, Ichika invites Futaro to play badminton and tells him he should properly confess to Yotsuba. In the meantime, Yotsuba apologizes to Nino for how things turned out, enraging the older sister in the process, as she threatens to disown her. After a karaoke night with Miku, Yotsuba decides to shoulder her sisters' frustration. Itsuki realizes that she also likes Futaro, but lets go of her feelings as Yotsuba declares her resolve to Nino that she will go out with him and also gain her sisters' approval. On their first date as a couple, Futaro proposes to Yotsuba, which she accepts. Five years later, Ichika has become a famous actress, Itsuki is working as a teacher, Nino and Miku are running a café, while Futaro and Yotsuba are living together in Tokyo. On the wedding day, Futaro manages to recognize all the quints who are dressed as the bride, and affirms how he takes pride in having been their tutor. After the reception is over, Futaro asks Yotsuba whether she was the one who kissed him under the bell five years before, which she indirectly confirms, stating she has many things she wants to tell him. They find her sisters, who plan to tag along on the couple's honeymoon. This exasperates Futaro, who remembers that something similar happened on their graduation trip, except this time he cracks a smile.

== Character books ==
No.	Title	Release date	ISBN
1	The Quintessential Quintuplets Character Book Ichika; Go-Tōbun no Hanayome Kyarakuta Bukku Ichika (五等分の花嫁 キャラクターブック 一花)	November 15, 2019	978-4-06-516921-6
2	The Quintessential Quintuplets Character Book Nino; Go-Tōbun no Hanayome Kyarakuta Bukku Nino (五等分の花嫁 キャラクターブック ニ乃)	December 17, 2019	978-4-06-517164-6
3	The Quintessential Quintuplets Character Book Miku; Go-Tōbun no Hanayome Kyarakuta Bukku Miku (五等分の花嫁 キャラクターブック 三玖)	January 17, 2020	978-4-06-517361-9
4	The Quintessential Quintuplets Character Book Yotsuba; Go-Tōbun no Hanayome Kyarakuta Bukku Yotsuba (五等分の花嫁 キャラクターブック 四葉)	February 17, 2020	978-4-06-518174-4
5	The Quintessential Quintuplets Character Book Itsuki; Go-Tōbun no Hanayome Kyarakuta Bukku Itsuki (五等分の花嫁 キャラクターブック 五月)	March 17, 2020	978-4-06-518558-2
