= Wren and Gurney =

Educational Institute for Preparation of Competitive Examinations

Wren and Gurney was a crammer which specialised in preparing candidates for the public examinations of the army, the United Kingdom civil service and Indian civil service.

The college was founded in 1874 as a partnership between Henry Palin Gurney and Walter Wren and became known as the foremost institution of its day in preparing candidates for competitive examinations, its success measured by the number of its students within the army and the British and Indian civil services. Its activities were conducted in Powis Square, London. After the partnership was formally dissolved in 1894 on Gurney's departure, the business continued under the stewardship of Wren alone until his death in 1898.

William Wyse, the classical scholar, was among those engaged as a tutor at the college. Students included:

- Sir Ernest Gowers, a civil servant and writer
- Robert Norman Bland, a colonial administrator in the Straits Settlements
- Sir William Duke, colonial Governor of Assam
