= Walter Wren =

English tutor and Liberal Party politician

Wren in 1880

Walter Wren (28 December 1833 – 5 August 1898) was an English tutor and Liberal Party politician who sat in the House of Commons briefly in 1880.

Wren was born at Buntingford, Hertfordshire, the son of Richard Wren (1804-1872), a maltster and coal merchant. He was educated at Buntingford and Elizabeth College, Guernsey before being admitted at Christ's College, Cambridge in 1852. He suffered severe disability from a spinal disease contracted there. He became a teacher and, at Wren and Gurney, the crammer he jointly established with Henry Palin Gurney, coached pupils privately for military college and for the Indian Civil Service. He was a radical Liberal and opposed the aristocracy and its privileges. He published a book of Wallingford Speeches 1878-1880.

At the 1880 general election Wren was elected as a Member of Parliament (MP) for Wallingford. However his election was declared void in June on account of bribery by one of his agents. He stood unsuccessfully at Lambeth North in 1885 and 1886. In 1889, he was a member of the first London County Council.

Wren died at the age of 64. A prize was founded in his honour at Christ's College in 1902.

Wren married firstly in 1860, Eliza Cox, daughter of William Cox of Halesowen, and secondly in 1867, Emily Horn, daughter of G. W. Horn of Richmond. He had several children; his daughter from his first marriage, Feona Mary Duport, married Frank Geere Howard, a Municipal Reform Party member of the London County Council; his fourth daughter, Mary Dorothea, married Sir Thomas Marris Taylor, C.B.E., a principal at Wren's school from 1898 to 1915, later a director of the Ministry of Munitions; a son, Emil Fitzwalter Wren (1871-1933), was a barrister.

Parliament of the United Kingdom
Preceded by Edward Wells	Member of Parliament for Wallingford; 1880 – June 1880	Succeeded by Pandeli Ralli
