= Electronic exam =

An electronic exam is a format of exam that is conducted on a computer. They can offer benefits such as ease of marking, reduced need to read illegible handwriting, and time savings.

== Models ==
- eExam System: the first use of any eExam for the award of a degree was in November 2009 at University of Tasmania. It was later adopted for entrance examinations by Tasmanian Qualifications Authority in 2011. In 2016 the eExam became the subject of a national project in Australian universities. Security methods limit access to the eExam flash drive, prevent use of all communication channels, and require a unique desktop security image photograph for every sitting. The source code is available under open source GPL licences.
- CQUniversity Australia: Exam Pro was used in a supervised eExam consisting of short answer and essay-type questions.
- Abitti: its mission was to transform university entrance assessments in Finland to eExams by 2020. The source code is available under a GPLv3 license.
- RU exam system: this uses a Linux-based system for student laptops at Reykjavik University
- Secure-Exam-Environment: from Alpen-Adria-Universität Klagenfurt uses Moodle on a Knoppix-flavoured Linux distribution.

== Challenges ==
Objections emphasize the unreliability of computer equipment or the potential for cheating. Some hacks cool the computer to 0 Celsius, allowing eExam information in the computer's RAM to be preserved for about 45 seconds. This is irrelevant if the exam is published after the assessment and open source software is used (since the material is in the public domain). These criticisms have been answered by a risk tree comparison with paper-based examinations, finding that typing and handwriting in examinations are similarly secure.

The challenges of e-exams are usability, increased stress due to unfamiliarity with e-exam systems, and inadequate functionality.

== See also ==
- Electronic assessment
