= Exam invigilator =

Person who enforces examination rules

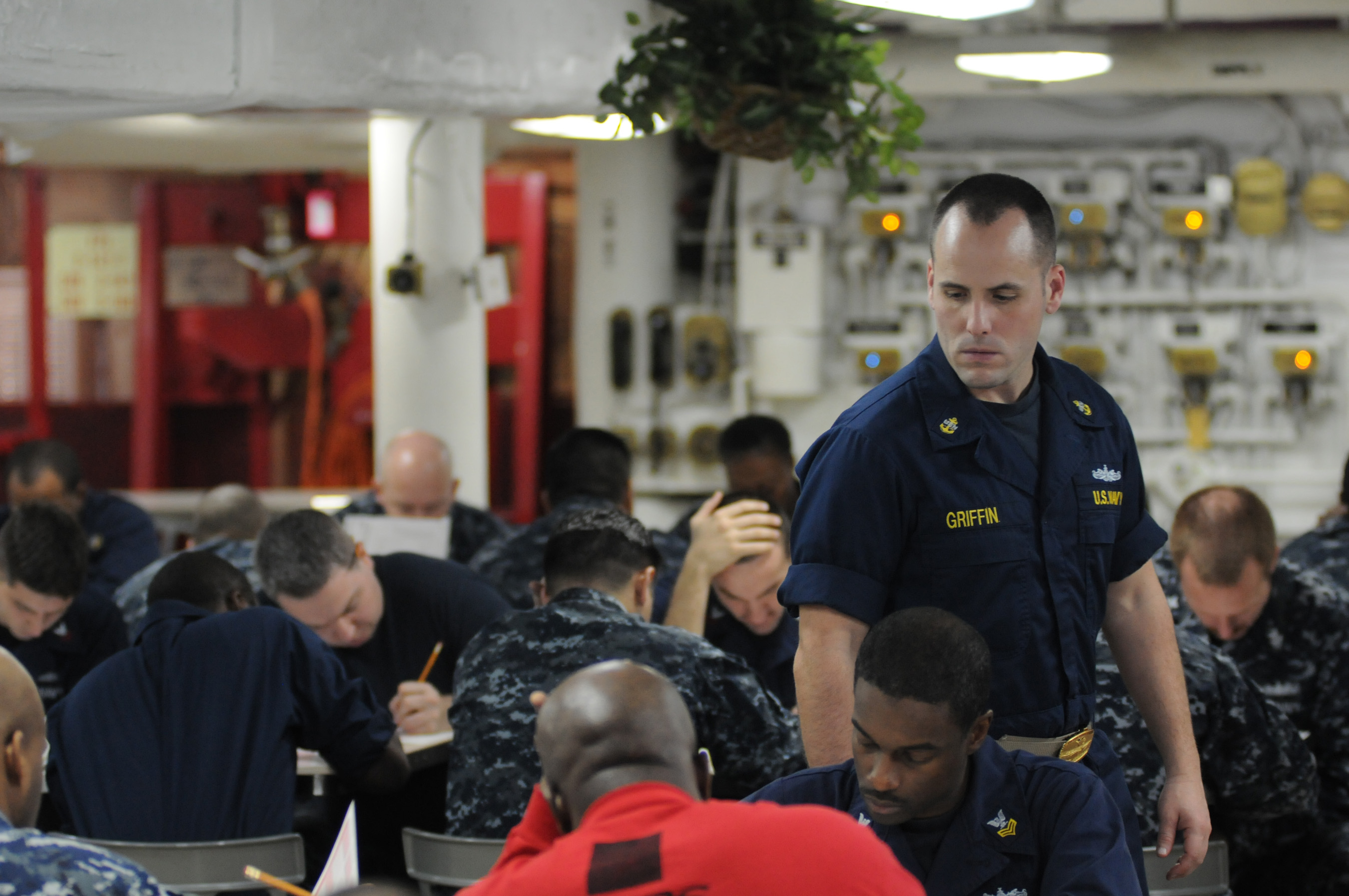
A proctor invigilating an exam in the US Navy

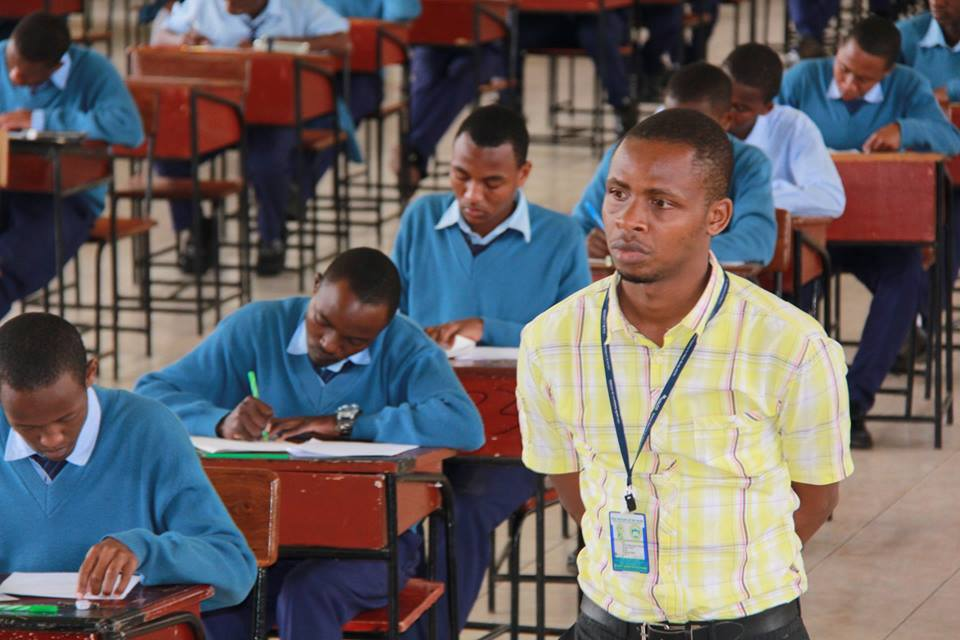
An invigilator proctoring an exam in Tanzania

An exam invigilator, exam proctor or exam supervisor is someone appointed by an educational institution or an examination board to maintain proper conduct in a particular examination in accordance with exam regulations. Typically, the main duty of an exam invigilator is to watch examination candidates to prevent cheating. The purpose of exam invigilating is to ensure each candidate sits the examination under equal conditions.

Exam invigilators are appointed to a position of trust and are expected to possess integrity and vigilance to conduct examinations in exact accordance with the board’s instructions.

== Purpose ==
The purpose of exam invigilation is to ensure that all candidates are under active surveillance for the entire examination to provide a fair examination for all candidates. In order to do so, they prevent any kind of communication between candidates such as by copying, whispering or any kind of signal, exchange of paper or objects, and any kind of access to unauthorized books, papers, or electronic media of any kind for the exam duration.

Invigilators also ensure the security of the examination room before, during and after the examination. Typically, exam envigilators patrol vigilantly from the moment the question papers are given out until all answers are collected, with particular emphasis given to multiple-choice and short-answer questions, the main goal being to prevent possible academic dishonesty and administrative failures.

The minimum number of invigilators required for different kinds of examinations depends on the type of examinations held. For general written examinations in the United Kingdom, there are typically at least one invigilator per 30 students in the examination room. Specialist invigilators may be present in some cases, for example invigilators with specific IT skills may be present for tests conducted using computers.

== Duties ==
=== General duties ===
The main duty of an exam invigilator is to ensure the fair conduct of examinations and an environment permitting candidates to demonstrate their achievement.

Tasks performed by an invigilator may include:

1. Setting up the examination venues by placing candidate numbers, booklets, examination papers, stationery and equipment at desks in accordance with strict procedures.
2. Implementing the exam rules and regulations and remaining vigilant throughout the examination duration.
3. Assisting the candidates before, during and after the examination by directing them to their seats, advising them about possessions permitted at examination venues and dealing with queries raised by candidates.
4. Invigilating carefully, making sure that candidates do not talk inside examination venues and also responding to any examination irregularities immediately.
5. Checking attendance during examinations, recording details of late arrivals and ensuring that proper seating plans are followed.
6. Escorting candidates during water breaks or washroom breaks as required and detecting any unauthorized materials inside the examination hall.
7. Delivering and collecting scripts carefully at the start and end of the examination in accordance with strict examination procedures.
8. Assisting with the packing of examination scripts, stationery and other equipment from the examination venues.
9. Supervising candidates in leaving the examination venues in a quiet and disciplined manner and ensuring that candidates do not remove equipment or stationery from the examination venue without the permission of the authority.

=== During the exam ===
During the examination, exam invigilators give their whole attention to the examination process and are typically prohibited from performing any other tasks throughout the examination’s duration.

Exam invigilators respond to queries from candidates and assist them per their needs. Invigilators also take attendance and check identifying information of the candidates.

Exam invigilators also deal with students who arrive late at the examination venue, recording their attendenace, and determine whether extra time will be granted to such candidates depending on specific school policies.

Invigilators may prevent the candidates from leaving the examination hall room at specific times and take immediate actions against candidates caught cheating during the examination. Invigilators confiscate unauthorized materials found inside the examination hall. In the event of an emergency or fire alarm, invigilators follow emergency exit procedures and lead the candidates safely outside the examination hall.

Invigilators remain silent during the examination and often do not respond to questions from candidates or allow any other person to ask questions of, or read answers to, the candidates.

=== After the exam ===
After the examination is over, the exam invigilators collect the scripts, question papers, stationery and other reference booklets from the candidates and check that all the required information (name, candidate number, venue, date, etc.) have been filled out by the candidates on their scripts properly. When all the scripts are collected, invigilators release the candidates and direct them towards the exit of the examination hall.

== E-proctoring ==
E-proctoring, also known as remote proctoring, is a form of exam proctoring which involves monitoring student behaviour during exams administered electronically, including those given as part of e-learning or remote learning and in-class digital exams]. Some of the use cases of proctoring include admission exams, certification exams, assessments conducted by recruiters and HR as part of their hiring, and training processes.

Concerns about the use of commercial e-proctoring services include the non-functionality of the software; it mostly fails to identify any actual fraud, while it can falsely flag innocent students for suspicious behavior. Some people claim it violates students' privacy, security, and impact to students' mental health. They also claim it is prone to technical issues that can negatively impact students' exam performance. In addition, there have been multiple reports of user data from commercial e-proctoring services being hacked, resulting in thousands of colleges' and hundreds of thousands of users' data being released.

=== Ineffectiveness ===
There is clear evidence to that it is easily possible for candidates to circumvent e-proctoring software. A scientific test of the Proctorio software at the University of Twente showed that the software was not able to detect any of the cases of examination fraud it was subjected to. It showed that classic, non-technical methods of exam fraud, such as the use of cheat sheets and notes, were nearly undetectable by Proctorio. Moreover, the software could also not identify any cases of committed digital/technical fraud, such as the use of a phone, chat apps and social media during the exam, looking up information on the internet while taking the test, and others. The conclusion was that the sensitivity of Proctorio should be considered at very close to zero.

=== Controversy ===
Controversy over e-proctoring escalated during the COVID-19 pandemic, when many universities, K–12 schools, and standardized testing organizations turned to commercial e-proctoring suppliers for services. Students across the world protested the use of commercial e-proctoring services at their post-secondary institutions. It has been noted that online proctoring technologies use algorithms that discriminate against students of darker skin tones, including Black students and other persons of colour.

==== Proctorio lawsuits ====
In 2020, e-proctoring software company Proctorio sued a university employee at the University of British Columbia over alleged breach of copyright. The employee was critical of Proctorio on social media and posted links to unlisted YouTube videos produced by the company. A court ruling on the case was published on 15 June 2021 and another on 11 March 2022, dismissing the case. In late 2022, the employee appealed the dismissal. In November 2025, the case was settled out of court. The exact terms of the settlement were kept confidential, but both parties confirmed no money was exchanged.

In 2020 a computer engineering student at a different college publicly shared excerpts of code installed by Proctorio on their personal computer. The student sued Proctorio after they had the material removed. Proctorio countersued arguing copyright infringement and defamation. The case was settled out of court.

Class-action lawsuits were brought up against Proctorio and two other companies. The companies were accused of failing to provide legally required data retention and destruction policies and failing to obtain consent for gathering biometric information. The lawsuit against Proctorio was dismissed by a judge in August 2022.

== Bibliography ==
- 320, Withheld. "How to Be a School Exam Invigilator." Career Path 360. N.p., 23 June 2009. Web. 10 July 2014.
- "The Exam Cycle : Invigilation." Department for Education. National College for Teaching & Leadership, 10 April 2014. Web. 6 July 2014.
- Guardian, The. "What I'm Really Thinking: The Exam Invigilator." The Guardian. Guardian News and Media, 14 July 2012. Web. 10 July 2014.
- "Invigilator." The Free Dictionary. Farlex, n.d. Web. 6 July 2014.
- "Job Title: Examination Invigilator." The Ridgeway School (2012): 1–2. Eteach. The Ridgeway School, June 2012. Web. 6 July 2014.
- Kumar, BC. "Invigilator – English Language Tutorials." English Language Tutorials. Web Learn Eng, n.d. Web. 10 July 2014.
- Laurent Pascale. British Council Invigilators – Code of Practice. Brussels: Laurent Pascale, (n.d). British Council Belgium. British Council. Web. 6 July 2014.
- "Main Navigation." Invigilators FAQs. Cambridge International Examinations, n.d. Web. 6 July 2014.
- McMahon, Mary, and Kristen Osborne. "What Does an Invigilator Do?" WiseGeek. Conjecture, 5 June 2014. Web. 10 July 2014.
