= Frankfurt Adaptive Concentration Test =

- Purpose: method for determining the individual concentration capacity

The Frankfurt Adaptive Concentration Test (FACT-2) is a computer-based testing method for determining the individual concentration capacity by means of discrimination tasks. The proband has to discriminate continually between geometric target and nontarget items as accurately and quickly as possible. Both, target items as well as non-target items require a specific reaction button. Thus a directed attention is required for all items.

The first edition of the test was introduced in 1997 by Moosbrugger and Heyden, the second edition 2005 by Moosbrugger and Goldhammer, each at Goethe University Frankfurt.

== Discrimination items ==
Upper line with targets, lower line with non-targets

There are four types of items, the so-called "Frankfurt Discrimination Items": Circle or square, each with two or three points in the middle. Each type is composed of two items that differ in the arrangement of dots.

The items "circle with 3 points" and "square with 2 points" are defined as targets, the items "circle with 2 points" and "square with 3 points" are defined as non-targets. Thus, there are thus two stimulus dimensions, namely, the geometric shape and the number of points . The third dimension, the arrangement of points, is irrelevant to the discrimination task.

Target items require to press the key "1" and non-target items require the key "0".

== Test versions ==
There are three versions of the test:

- FACT-I: only one item is displayed on the screen, immediate discrimination, adaptability of the rate (high stress)
- FACT-S : simultaneously 10 items in a row, discrimination from left to right one by one, adaptability of the rate (average stress)
- FACT-SR: simultaneously 10 items in a row, discrimination from left to right one by one, no adaptivity of the rate, response times for the discrimination are measured (low stress)

The adaptivity of the rate means that the duration, how long the screen content with one or more items are displayed, is varied by an algorithm until it matches the individual capacity of the test subject. The rate is the higher, the better the power of concentration.

== Test duration ==
For each test version different durations can be selected:

- Adaptive duration: the test ends as soon as the measurement reaches an accuracy criterion (at least 2 minutes at most 6 minutes)
- Fixed duration: 6 minutes (standard test time), 12, 18, 24 or 30 minutes can be selected

== Evaluation ==
The test examines the extent to which the subject is able to focus its attention over a long period of time to certain stimuli or activities. These are continuous selection, coordination and control of action patterns using voluntary effort.

The FACT-2 covers the following aspects:

- Power of concentration (work rate)
- Accuracy of concentration (relative correctness)
- Homogeneity of concentration (uniformity of work rate)

The results are calculated for the adaptive test time and for any 6-minute section. Standard values are available for the interpretation.
