= Revision week =

Week before final exams to study; typically without classes

Revision week is a period in the UK and other Commonwealth countries preceding examinations in high schools, higher education institutions, and military colleges. In American colleges, this period is known as a Reading Period. Generally, this period is one week long and free of classes or assessment, permitting students to spend the period revising material, generally in preparation for final exams. With the exception of Canadian post-secondary institutions, a reading period is not often allocated for mid-semester or ongoing assessment. Each day of such a period may be referred to as a reading day. Hell week is used in many similar educational contexts, such as police or military training.

The term "revision week" is chiefly used in Commonwealth countries, where it is also known as "swotvac" or "stuvac". For post-secondary institutions in anglophone Canada, it is common to have "reading week" or "mid-term break" during the third week of February, coinciding with Family Day. While in francophone Canada, "semaine d'études," "semaine d'activités libres," or "semaine de lecture," typically falls on the first or second week of March. Some Canadian post-secondary institutions have even adopted reading weeks for the fall academic term, either in October or November, typically coinciding with Thanksgiving or Remembrance Day respectively. In the US this period is generally referred to as reading period or (as slang) dead week or dead days.

== Swotvac ==
The term swotvac (swot vac, swotvac) is commonly used in Commonwealth countries, particularly Australia, to refer to this period. The term is a blend of the swot and vac (vacation), indicating the period free of classes. "Swot" (or less commonly swat) is a dialectal word (Scottish) originally meaning "to sweat", which found use as a slang word describing a student paying careful attention to his work. Swot as a verb suggests acting like a swot, studying for one's exams.

The use of the uncommon and outmoded word 'swot' has led to the backronym Study Week Or Take VACation or Study WithOut Teaching (or Tuition) VACation. There are many other different backronyms that can be derived, and the term stuvac (STUdy VACation, STUdent VACation) is also found.

Though once popular and used by universities as the official name for the week, the term seems to have fallen from favour and replaced with study week. As of 2014, however, it is still used by at least three of Australia's Group of 8 universities on the academic calendar.

== Dead week ==
Dead week, or hell week, is US slang for the week before college and university final examinations. The week is often characterized by heightened test anxiety, students working to overcome procrastinating their test preparation or writing term papers. This can lead to sleep deprivation, irritability, and vomiting. There are often all-night studying sessions, and greater use of stimulants like coffee, caffeine tablets, energy drinks, Adderall, or other prescription amphetamines.

Many campus dormitories or residence halls require near silence for most of the day during the week before finals. There may also be a moratorium on paper assignments, exams, and student organizational activities during dead week. Libraries may also be open for extended hours, or might stay available all night.

=== Examples ===
- Iowa State University — Dead Week has become an official University-recognized event. Student organizations are not allowed to meet. There are 23/7 mandatory quiet hours in the student dormitories (the non-quiet, 24th hour is dubbed Rowdy Hour)
- Yale University — The Pundits, a nominally anonymous student group, organizes a naked run through Bass Library, where many students study for their exams. The event is usually around midnight and the runners hand out candy to the crowd.
- Stanford University — Students engage in the "primal scream" at midnight every night of Dead Week. Professors are banned from assigning additional homework and may not cover new material. The university bans all on-campus parties during dead week and finals week.
- Cornell University — Students scream as loudly as possible out of their windows at midnight the night before the first day of finals. This is known as the midnight scream.
- Columbia University — Students open their windows at midnight and scream as loudly as possible on the Sunday of finals week each semester, popularly known as the Primal Scream. The tradition helps students release their pent up stress and anxiety about exams. At midnight the eve of the first Monday of finals, students participate in a Spring Pillow Fight.
- Georgia Tech — Professors that give traditional exams may assign homework and projects during dead week, but may not assign tests, quizzes, lab reports and lab practicums. Professors that give a non traditional exam, such as a project or lab report, may give homework and the alternate exam assignment during dead week or finals week. Tests, quizzes, and additional lab reports and lab practicums are not allowed during dead week. In either case, professors cannot give any assignment besides the exam during finals week. In practice, many professors take advantage of this and assign homework and projects during dead week. On the Friday of Dead Week, freShGA (freshman leadership organization) hosts its annual One Night Stand. Starting at 10pm and going until 4am, students spend the Friday of Dead Week at the Campus Recreation Center for a night of sport competitions, relays, and tournaments with free food and amazing prizes. Also, Midnight Madness occurs every night during dead week and students scream to vent frustration at midnight. The band also “unofficially” partakes in the Midnight bud, where the band members coincidentally show up in the freshmen quad at midnight. Traditionally, “To hell with Georgia” is sung and the fight songs are played. Then, the band travels to North Avenue Apartments and repeats. The Midnight bud occurs on the final night of exams.
- Northwestern University — A tradition known as the "Primal Scream" that takes place at 9 pm on the Sunday night before finals week. The Primal Scream marks the end of reading week, a time when most classes are not in session, and the beginning of finals week.
- University of California, Berkeley — Students may choose to participate in a naked run through Moffitt Library in an effort to relieve their stress.
- University of California, Los Angeles — Operating on the quarter system, there is no 'dead week.' Instead, students engage in a 'primal scream' at midnight of every night of finals week. The Undie Run, where students run in their underwear from the intersection of Strathmore and Gayley to Royce Hall, occurs at midnight on the Wednesday of finals week.
- University of Vermont — Students get together at midnight on the last day of classes for the naked bike ride through Athletic Campus. Students can bike or run.
- Michigan State University — During the Sunday–Thursday of finals week students across campus open their windows at midnight and scream.
- Penn State University - During the Sunday of finals week right at sunset, students gather at Mifflin Street and run naked down the hill. This is known as the Mifflin Streak.

== Timing ==
It is scheduled after all the regular class lectures and before final exams. In some universities, reading days in the Fall semesters are being scheduled two days before Thanksgiving holidays to extend the holiday weekend like a spring break. However, this break is followed by the last week of classes and final examination week.

== Duration ==
In many cases, student governments have lobbied to introduce, extend, or preserve reading days as a day exclusively for study and have run into conflict with teachers who like to use it as an additional day for lectures or exams. Another issue is that some students may prefer to take exams on reading day in order to get the semester over with.

== See also ==
- Schoolies week, Australian vacation week following exams
- Study skills
