= Electronic assessment =

Use of information technology in assessment

Electronic assessment, also known as digital assessment, e-assessment, online assessment or computer-based assessment, is the use of information technology in assessment such as educational assessment, health assessment, psychiatric assessment, and psychological assessment. This covers a wide range of activities ranging from the use of a word processor for assignments to on-screen testing. Specific types of e-assessment include multiple choice, online/electronic submission, computerized adaptive testing such as the Frankfurt Adaptive Concentration Test, and computerized classification testing.

Different types of online assessments contain elements of one or more of the following components, depending on the assessment's purpose: formative, summative and diagnostic. Instant and detailed feedback may (or may not) be enabled.

In formative assessment, often defined as 'assessment for learning', digital tools are increasingly being adopted by schools, higher education institutions and professional associations to measure where students are in their skills or knowledge. This can make it easier to provide tailored feedback, interventions or action plans to improve learning and attainment. Gamification is one type of digital assessment tool that can engage students in a different way whilst gathering data that teachers can use to gain insight.

In summative assessment, which could be described as 'assessment of learning', exam boards and awarding organisations delivering high-stakes exams often find the journey from paper-based exam assessment to fully digital assessment a long one. Practical considerations such as having the necessary IT hardware to enable large numbers of student to sit an electronic examination at the same time, as well as the need to ensure a stringent level of security (for example, see: Academic dishonesty) are among the concerns that need to resolved to accomplish this transition.

E-marking is one way that many exam assessment and awarding bodies, such as Cambridge International Examinations, are utilizing innovations in technology to expedite the marking of examinations. In some cases, e-marking can be combined with electronic examinations, whilst in other cases students will still hand-write their exam responses on paper scripts which are then scanned and uploaded to an e-marking system for examiners to mark on-screen.

== Application ==
E-assessment is becoming more widely used by exam awarding bodies, particularly those with multiple or international study centres and those which offer remote study courses. Industry bodies such as The e-Assessment Association (eAA), founded in 2008, as well as events run by the Association of Test Publishers (ATP) that focus specifically on Innovations in Testing, represent the growth in adoption of technology-enhanced assessment.

In psychiatric and psychological testing, e-assessment can be used not only to assess cognitive and practical abilities but anxiety disorders, such as social anxiety disorder, i.e. SPAI-B. Widely in psychology. Cognitive abilities are assessed using e-testing software, while practical abilities are assessed using e-portfolios or simulation software.

== Types ==
Online assessment is used primarily to measure cognitive abilities, demonstrating what has been learned after a particular educational event has occurred, such as the end of an instructional unit or chapter. When assessing practical abilities or demonstrating learning that has occurred over a longer period of time an online portfolio (or ePortfolio) is often used. The first element that must be prepared when teaching an online course is assessment. Assessment is used to determine if learning is happening, to what extent and if changes need to be made.

=== Independent work ===
Most students will not complete assignments unless there is an assessment (i.e. motivation). It is the instructor's role to catalyze student motivation. Appropriate feedback is the key to assessment, whether or not the assessment is graded.

=== Group work ===
Students are often asked to work in groups. This brings on new assessment strategies. Students can be evaluated using a collaborative learning model in which the learning is driven by the students and/or a cooperative learning model where tasks are assigned and the instructor is involved in decisions.

Pre-testing – Prior to the teaching of a lesson or concept, a student can complete an online pretest to determine their level of knowledge. This form of assessment helps determine a baseline so that when a summative assessment or post-test is given, quantitative evidence is provided showing that learning has occurred.

Formative assessment – Formative assessment is used to provide feedback during the learning process. In online assessment situations, objective questions are posed, and feedback is provided to the student either during or immediately after the assessment.

Summative assessment – Summative assessments provide a quantitative grade and are often given at the end of a unit or lesson to determine that the learning objectives have been met.

Practice Testing – With the ever-increasing use of high-stakes testing in the educational arena, online practice tests are used to give students an edge. Students can take these types of assessments multiple times to familiarize themselves with the content and format of the assessment.

Surveys – Online surveys may be used by educators to collect data and feedback on student attitudes, perceptions or other types of information that might help improve instruction.

Evaluations – This type of survey enables facilitators to collect data and feedback for evaluating or improving a course or learning experience.

Performance testing – The user shows what they know and what they can do. This type of testing is used to show technological proficiency, reading comprehension, math skills, etc. This assessment is also used to identify gaps in student learning.

New technologies, such as the Web, digital video, sound, animations, and interactivity, are providing tools that can make assessment design and implementation more efficient, timely, and sophisticated.

== Electronic marking ==
Electronic marking, also known as e-marking and onscreen marking, is the use of digital educational technology specifically designed for marking. The term refers to the electronic marking or grading of an exam. E-marking is an examiner led activity closely related to other e-assessment activities such as e-testing, or e-learning which are student led. E-marking allows markers to mark a scanned script or online response on a computer screen rather than on paper.

There are no restrictions to the types of tests that can use e-marking, with e-marking applications designed to accommodate multiple choice, written, and even video submissions for performance examinations. E-marking software is used by individual educational institutions and can also be rolled out to the participating schools of awarding exam organizations. e-marking has been used to mark many well-known high stakes examinations, which in the United Kingdom include A levels and GCSE exams, and in the US includes the SAT test for college admissions. Ofqual reports that e-marking is the main type of marking used for general qualifications in the United Kingdom.

=== History ===
Early adopters include the University of Cambridge Local Examinations Syndicate, (which operates under the brand name Cambridge Assessment) which conducted its first major test of e-marking in November 2000. Cambridge Assessment has conducted extensive research into e-marking and e-assessment. The syndicate has published a series of papers, including research specific to e-marking such as: Examining the impact of moving to on-screen marking on concurrent validity.

In 2007, the International Baccalaureate implemented e-marking. In 2012, 66% of nearly 16 million exam scripts were "e-marked" in the United Kingdom. Ofqual reports that in 2015, all key stage 2 tests in the United Kingdom will be marked onscreen.

In 2010, Mindlogicx implemented onscreen marking system for the first time in India at Anna University enabling easy operations and efficient conduction of high stakes examination.

In 2014, the Scottish Qualifications Authority (SQA) announced that most of the National 5 question papers would be e-marked.

In June 2015, the Odisha state government in India announced that it planned to use e-marking for all Plus II papers from 2016.

=== Process ===
E-marking can be used to mark examinations that are completed on paper and then scanned and uploaded as digital images, as well as online examinations. Multiple-choice exams can be either marked by examiners online or be automarked where appropriate. When marking written script exams, e-marking applications provide markers with online tools and resources to mark as they go and can add up marks as they progress without exceeding the prescribed total for each question.

All candidate details are hidden from the work being marked to ensure anonymity during the marking process. Once marking is complete, results can be uploaded immediately, reducing both the time spent by examiners posting results and the wait time for students.

The e-marking FAQ is a comprehensive list of answers to frequently asked questions surrounding e-marking.

== Advantages ==
It has also been noted that in regards to university level work, providing electronic feedback can be more time-consuming than traditional assessments, and therefore more expensive.

In 1986, Lichtenwald investigated the test validity and test reliability of either personal computer administration or a paper and pencil administration of the Peabody Picture Vocabulary Test-Revised (PPVT-R). His project report included a review and analysis of the literature of pre-mid 1980s E-assessment systems.

A review of the literature of E-assessment from the 1970s until 2000 examined the advantages and disadvantages of E-assessments.

A detailed review of the literature regarding advantages and disadvantages of E-assessment for different types of tests for different types of students in different educational environment from childhood through young adulthood was completed in 2010. In higher education settings, there is variation in the ways academics perceive the benefits of e-assessment. While some perceive e-assessment processes as integral to teaching, others think of e-assessment in isolation from teaching and their students' learning.

=== Academic dishonesty ===
Academic dishonesty, commonly known as cheating, occurs at all levels of educational institutions. In traditional classrooms, students cheat in various forms such as hidden prepared notes not permitted to be used or looking at another student's paper during an exam, copying homework from one another, or copying from a book, article or media without properly citing the source. Individuals can be dishonest due to lack of time management skills, the pursuit of better grades, cultural behavior or a misunderstanding of plagiarism.

Online classroom environments are no exception to the possibility of academic dishonesty. It can easily be seen from a student's perspective as an easy passing grade. Proper assignments types, meetings and projects can prevent academic dishonesty in the online classroom. However, online assessment may provide additional possibilities for cheating, such as hacking.

Two common types of academic dishonesty are identity fraud and plagiarism.

Identity fraud can occur in the traditional or online classroom. There is a higher chance in online classes due to the lack of proctored exams or instructor-student interaction. In a traditional classroom, instructors have the opportunity to get to know the students, learn their writing styles or use proctored exams. To prevent identity fraud in an online class, instructors can use proctored exams through the institutions testing center or require students to come in at a certain time for the exam. Correspondence through phone or video conferencing techniques can allow an instructor to become familiar with a student through their voice and appearance. Another option would be personalize assignments to students backgrounds or current activities. This allows the student to apply it to their personal life and gives the instructor more assurance the actual student is completing the assignment. Lastly, an instructor may not make the assignments heavily weighted so the students do not feel as pressured.

Plagiarism is the misrepresentation of another person's work. It is easy to copy and paste from the internet or retype directly from a source. It is not only the exact wordage, but the thought or idea. It is important to learn to properly cite a source when using someone else's work.

== Interoperability ==
To assist sharing of assessment items across disparate systems, standards such as the IMS Global Question and Test Interoperability specification (QTI) have emerged.

== See also ==
- Cambridge Neuropsychological Test Automated Battery
- CDR computerized assessment system
- Computer-adaptive test
- Computerized classification test
- Educational technology
- eExam
