= Cramming (education) =

Learning technique

In education, cramming is the practice of working intensively to absorb large volumes of information in short amounts of time. It is also known as massed learning. It is often done by students in preparation for upcoming exams, especially just before them. Usually the student's priority is to obtain shallow recall suited to a superficial examination protocol, rather than to internalize the deep structure of the subject matter. Cramming is often discouraged by educators because the hurried coverage of material tends to result in poor long-term retention of material, a phenomenon often referred to as the spacing effect. Despite this, educators nevertheless widely persist in the use of superficial examination protocols, because these questions are easier to compose, quicker (and therefore cheaper for the institution) to grade, and objective on their own terms. When cramming, one attempts to focus only on studies and to forgo unnecessary actions or habits.

In contrast with cramming, active learning and critical thinking are two methods which emphasize the retention of material through the use of class discussions, study groups and individual thinking. Each has been cited as a more effective means of learning and retaining information as compared to cramming and memorization.

=== Relationship to academic procrastination ===
Cramming is closely linked to academic procrastination. There are different reasons for academic procrastination; one of being the attitude toward the course. This is a reason for anxiety when it comes to classes (especially for college students). Students will procrastinate because they are stressed and want to achieve good grades. This, in turn, leads to cramming. Procrastination is not just poor time management, college students, digital distractions are often the number one factor. Too much use of social media can trigger intrusive thoughts and can cause mental and physical fatigue, which causes students to, in turn, push their work off more. A two-week digital detox study shows that reducing smartphone screen time lowers stress and academic procrastination while improving focus and productivity.

== Prevalence ==
In Commonwealth countries, cramming usually occurs during the revision week (week before exams), also known as "swotvac" or "stuvac".

== As a study technique ==
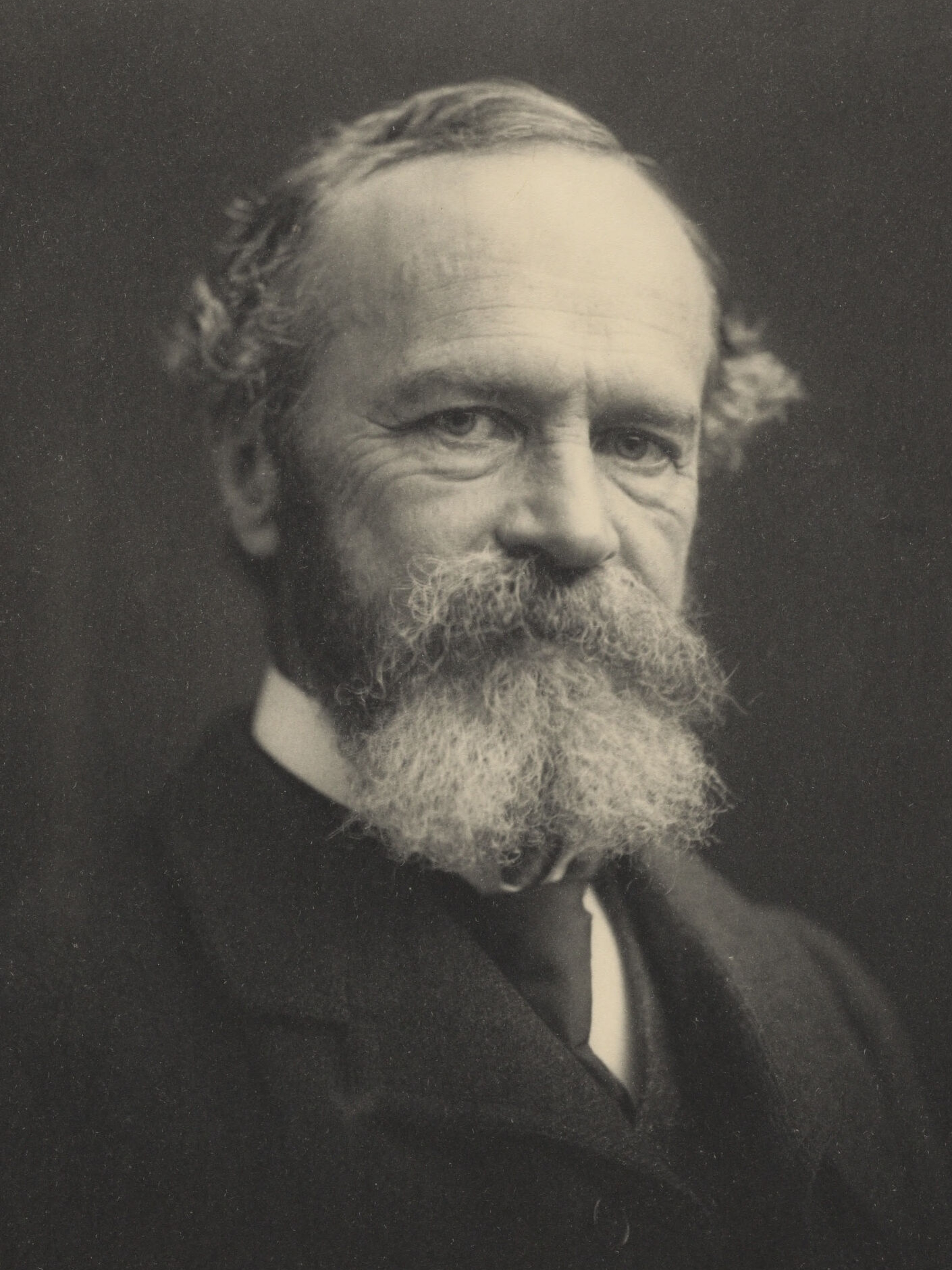
"The reason why cramming is such a bad mode of study is now made clear. I mean by cramming that way of preparing for examinations by committing "points" to memory during a few hours or days of intense application immediately preceding the final ordeal, little or no work having been performed during the previous course of the term. Things learned thus in a few hours, on one occasion, for one purpose, cannot possibly have formed many associations with other things in the mind. Their brain-processes are led into by few paths, and are relatively little liable to be awakened again. Speedy oblivion is the almost inevitable fate of all that is committed to memory in this simple way." - William James, The Principles of Psychology

H.E. Gorst stated in his book, The Curse of Education, "as long as education is synonymous with cramming on an organized plan, it will continue to produce mediocrity."

Generally considered an undesirable study technique, cramming became more and more common among students both at the secondary and university levels. Pressure to perform well in the classroom and engage in extracurricular activities in addition to other responsibilities often results in the cramming method of studying. Cramming is a widely used study skill performed in preparation for an examination or other performance-based assessment.

Most common among high school and college-aged students, cramming is often used as a means of memorizing large amounts of information in a short amount of time. Students are often forced to cram after improper time utilization or in efforts to understand information shortly before being tested. Improper time management is usually the cause for last-minute cramming sessions, and many study techniques have been developed to help students succeed instead of cramming.

== School performance ==
Teaching students to avoid last-minute cramming is a large area of concern for education professionals and profit for educational corporations and businesses. Learning and teaching study techniques that enhance retention as opposed to learning for a single examination is one of the core issues that plagues colleges and university academic advisors, and also adds to the stress of academic success for students. Ideally, proper study skills need to be introduced and practiced as early as possible in order for students to effectively learn positive study mechanisms.

According to William G. Sommer, students in a university system often adapt to the time-constraints that are placed upon them in college, and often use cramming to perform well on tests. In his article, Procrastination and Cramming: How Adept Students Ace the System, he states "Many students outwardly adapt to this system, however, engage in an intense and private ritual that comprises five aspects: calculated procrastination, preparatory anxiety, climactic cramming, nick-of-time deadline-making, and a secret, if often uncelebrated, victory. These adept students often find it difficult to admit others into their efficient program of academic survival."

== Research ==
Hermann Ebbinghaus is considered a pioneer in research on cramming. He is the first person to compare between distributed learning and cramming.

== See also ==
- Active learning
- Cram (game show)
- Cram school
- Critical thinking
- Rote learning
- Spaced repetition
- Study skills
