= Elizabeth College, Guernsey =

Elizabeth College

Location
- The Grange; Saint Peter Port, GY1 2PY; Guernsey
- Coordinates: 49.456630°N 2.540273°W

Information
- Other names: The College; Elizabeth
- Former name: Queen Elizabeth's Grammar School (1563–1826) (Note: From its establishment until its rechartering in 1824, the school was also referred to as Le College de notre Souverayne Dame La Royne, Grande Eschole de la Royne and Ecole Elisabeth.)
- Type: Public school Independent school
- Motto: Latin: Semper eadem (Always the same)
- Religious affiliation: Church of England
- Established: 1563; 463 years ago
- Founder: Elizabeth I
- Principal: Jenny Palmer
- Chaplain: Peter Graysmith
- Staff: c. 110
- Gender: Boys (1563–2021); Co-educational (2021–)
- Age range: 11–18
- Enrolment: c. 570
- Houses: Country; North; South; Town
- Colours: Navy blue and gold
- Song: Carmen Eliabethanum
- Rival: Victoria College, Jersey
- Publication: The Elizabethan
- School fees: £5,216 per term (2024/2025)
- Affiliation: HMC (The Heads' Conference)
- Alumni: Old Elizabethans
- Visitor: Bishop of Winchester
- Website: elizabethcollege.gg
- Charity Commission for England and Wales. Elizabeth College, registered charity no. 1120954; Guernsey Charities Registry. Elizabeth College, registered charity no. CH91.

The Royal College of Elizabeth, better known as Elizabeth College, is a co-educational independent school in Saint Peter Port, Guernsey. A member of the HMC (The Heads' Conference), it is a public school in the sense of the term used in England and Wales. Founded on 25 May 1563 by royal charter from Elizabeth I, it is one of the oldest schools in the British Isles and the oldest public school in the Channel Islands.

The school endured a turbulent two and a half centuries after its foundation, with several principals being dismissed or resigning following disputes with the local authorities. In 1824, it was re-chartered with new staff and an improved curriculum to attract fee-paying pupils from England. During the German occupation of the Channel Islands, the school was evacuated to Great Hucklow, Derbyshire. Having been a boarding school since its foundation, the decline in the number of pupils admitted as boarders following the world war period meant the school became a day school in 1996. The school became co-educational in 2021.

The school teaches around 570 pupils aged 11 to 18. As a selective school, prospective pupils must pass an entrance exam to be offered a place, although the school accepts pupils from a wide ability range. The school charges £5,216 per term, with three terms per academic year, (or £15,648 per annum) as of 2024/2025. There is an associated junior school for ages 2½ to 11 on adjoining sites at the nearby Acorn House (pre-school), in King's Road, and Beechwood (primary school), in Queen's Road.

Alumni of the school are known as Old Elizabethans. Since 1824, pupils have been allocated a unique, sequential school number. Among these alumni are multiple Olympians, several Bailiffs of Guernsey and other notable persons. Noted in the nineteenth and early-twentieth centuries for producing students who later joined military colleges in the UK, the school's alumni includes four Victoria Cross recipients.

== History ==
=== Foundation ===
In the mid-sixteenth century, the Queen's Commissioners raised concern over the civil, political and religious administration of Guernsey. In the year the school was founded, three people were burned for witchcraft. The Privy Council thought, therefore, that the island required secondary education in the hope that students might go on to preach as clergymen on the island in line with principles of the Protestant Reformation. They recommended the establishment of a school by royal charter, whereby a free grammar school would be founded by the States of Guernsey with a master appointed by the island's Governor. The school was founded on 25 May 1563 as Queen Elizabeth's Grammar School by a patent roll from Elizabeth I which read:

Also since there is no grammar school in the isle, to erect a free grammar school there called Queen Elizabeth's Grammar School under the seal of the isle; the schoolmaster thereof to be appointed and removable by the Captain (except the Queen shall otherwise order); the school to be endowed with wheat rentes of 80 quarters a year found to belong to the Queen by the late Commissioners.

It was the fourth school to be established on the island. To create a site for the school, Franciscan friars were moved from land at La Rue Des Frères. The first schoolmaster was Belgian scholar, Adrian Saravia. Saravia left the island by 1571, describing the local population as an "uncivilised race" which "hates all learning". Over the next two and a half centuries the school struggled to survive, in large part due to shortcomings with the statutes on which the school was founded: the raising of funds was a near-constant issue, with buildings being abandoned and land alienated; principals (then known as masters) came and went; the pupil roll never exceeded 29 and, for several periods, there were no students at the school at all.

=== Reform and reconstruction ===
In 1824, due to increased demand for a higher standard of local education, including at the school, the island's Lieutenant Governor, John Colborne, established a committee to review the school. It was re-chartered that year, and on 19 October 1826 the foundation stone of a new school building to be designed John Wilson was laid by Colborne and the school was renamed the Royal College of Elizabeth. The reform introduced a register of pupils, whereby pupils are allocated a unique, sequential school number.

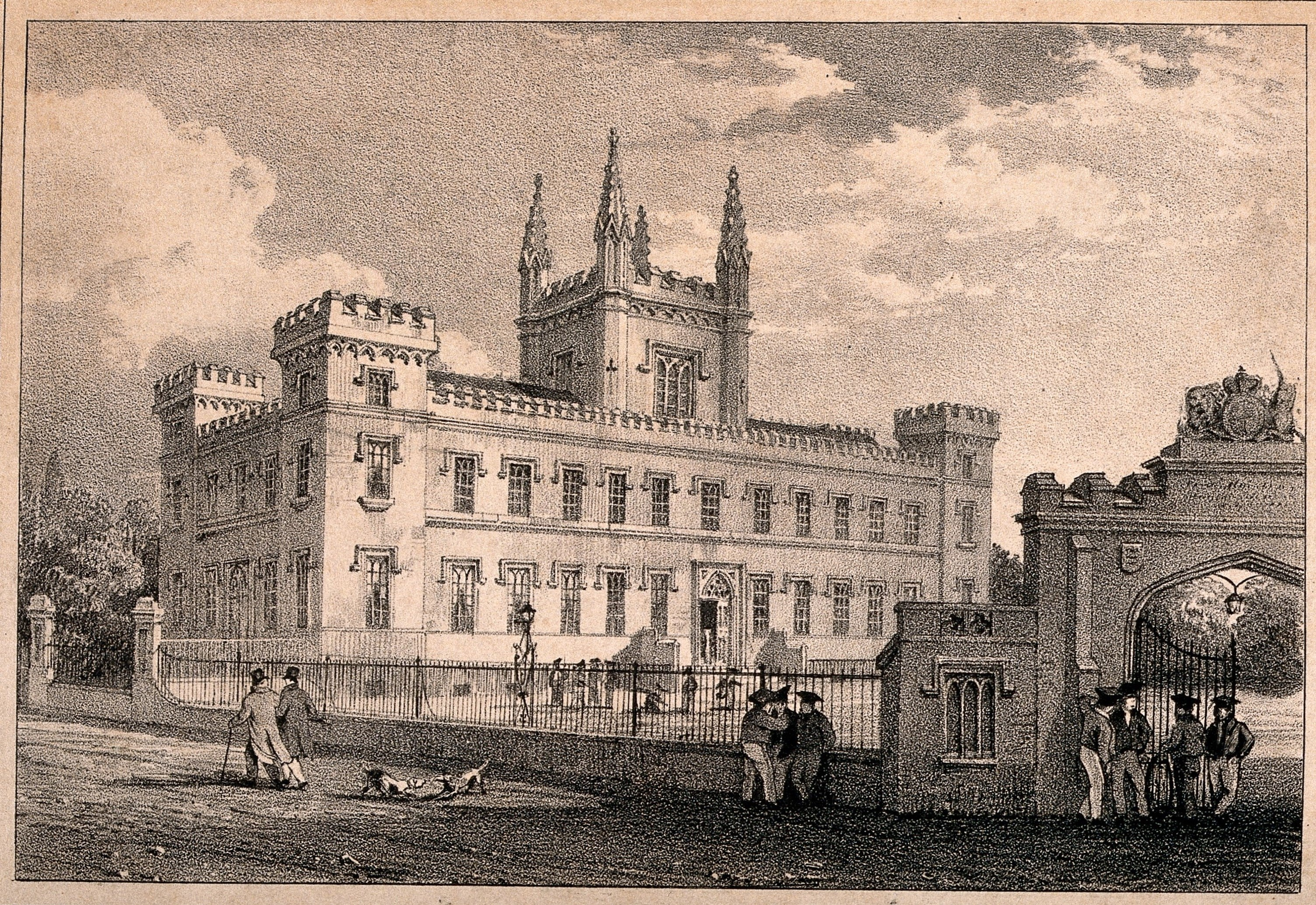
A lithograph of a drawing of the school's main building by its architect, John Wilson

After the re-chartering, Charles Stocker was appointed principal and developed a reputation for flogging. He set out to raise the academic standing of the school and oversee the construction of the new main building. In the school's first year after the re-chartering, there were more than 100 boys on the school roll. However, over the next couple of years, the number of new entrants decreased to as low as 17 in 1827. In 1829, three years after the laying of the foundation stone, the new building was ready for use.

The school expanded its teaching and extra-curricular facilities in the latter half of the nineteenth century, building a gymnasium on the main site and purchasing fields in Kings Road for a cricket ground which was completed in 1888. The original school building was converted into a science laboratory. Some of the biggest developments came under principal William Penney, appointed in 1888, who identified faults with the quality of teaching and attended to the school's main building which was badly in need of repair. Penney revised the syllabus, introduced masters' meetings to be held twice a term and had reports sent to parents every half term. He revised the punishment system too, only allowing himself and the vice-principal to use the cane, oversaw the reincarnation of The Elizabethan magazine, and formed the Old Elizabethan Association, which set about wiping the school's debts by 1898 through a variety of money-raising ventures.

=== World war period ===
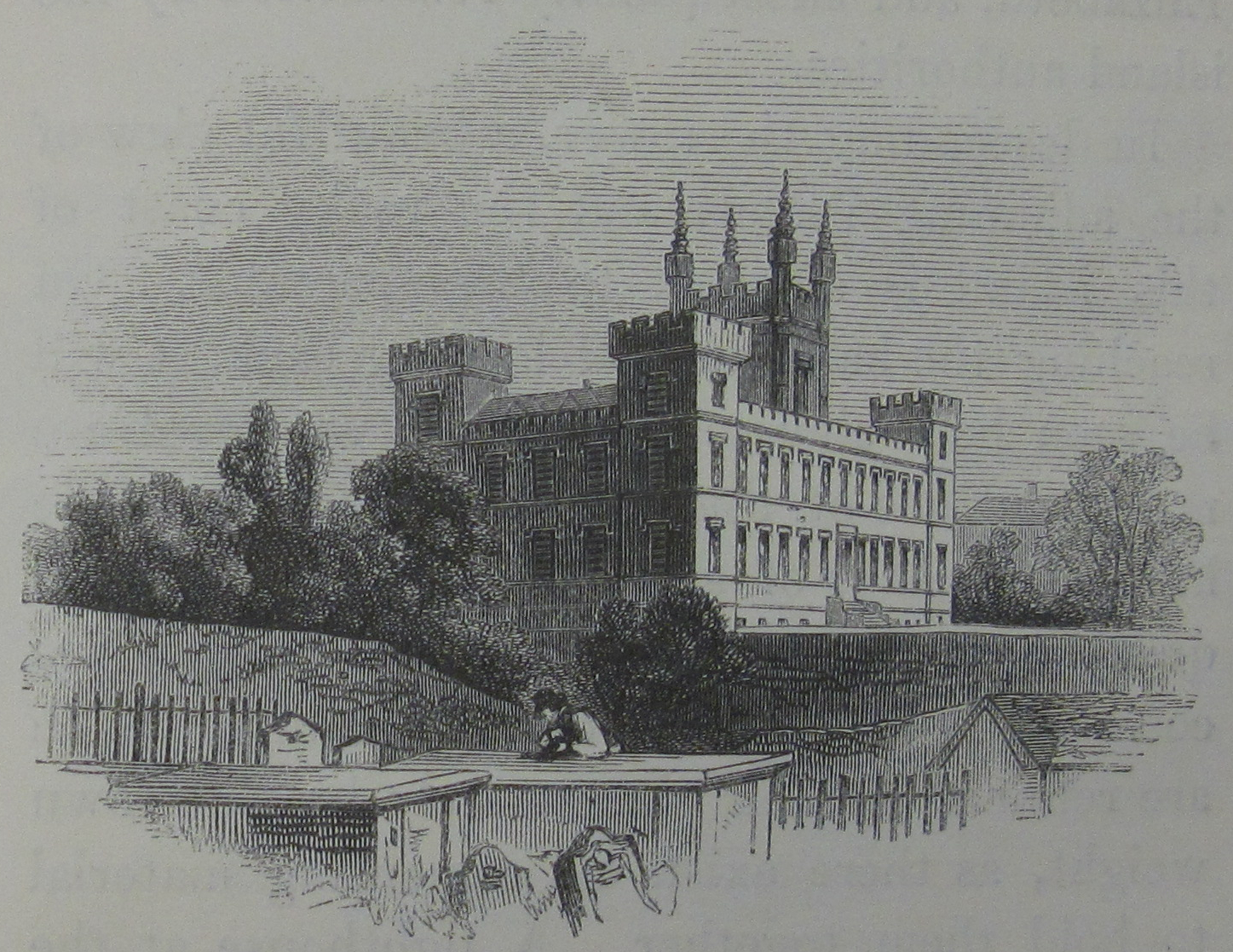
An illustration of the school's main building from a nearby cemetery by Armand de Quatrefages, c. 1860

In the nineteenth century, the school gained a reputation for catering for the sons of British government officials employed across the British Empire, many of whom followed distinguished colonial careers. In this era, the school was noted for producing students who would later join military colleges in the United Kingdom. 662 alumni served in World War I, 105 of which were known to have been killed and many more died of injuries sustained in battle, meaning approximately one in five of all the boys who had joined the school since the re-chartering had served in the Great War. A roll of honour is displayed in the main hall to commemorate those who fought and died in the war. Four alumni have been awarded the Victoria Cross: Duncan Home in 1857, John McCrea in 1881, Lewis Halliday in 1900 and Wallace Le Patourel in 1943. (Note: The four houses at the junior school were later named in their memory.)

In 1939, the school remained largely unaffected by the transition from peace to the Phoney War, with many believing the Channel Islands to be the safest place in the British Isles. Precautionary measures were taken nonetheless: air-raid shelters were dug in front of the school's main building and black-out regulations required some school activities and societies to be curtailed. The air-raid shelter was later converted by German forces into a secure holding area for weapons and ammunition. Following developments in the war in May 1940, senior boys were required to join the Local Defence Volunteers and came to school with rifles slung across their shoulders. Many school activities continued uninterrupted at this point, with cricket and swimming continuing in the unusually fine weather. In June however, the extent of the dangers of war were realised. French resistance collapsed, after which the island's army and RAF units left the island. Fearing imminent occupation by German forces, an evacuation scheme was quickly assembled by the school governors with Jersey and the Home Office. On the evening of Thursday, 20 June the school was evacuated to Great Hucklow, Derbyshire, where it would spend five years during which pupils had little or no contact with their parents.

At the start of the occupation, the school buildings were home to the States Controlling Committee, but in 1941 the German authorities demanded the use of the school buildings as its headquarters. A strongroom bunker was built inside what is now the 'AJ Perrot' room, which remains to this day, albeit without the door. Despite the shortages in staff, facilities and money, eight pupils receiving scholarships to the University of Oxford in this period. The official liberation announcement by Brigadier Alfred Ernest Snow was made from the steps of the school in 1945 to a crowd of cheering locals. However, it was not until August that boys were able to return home and continue their education on island. German prisoners of war were tasked with cleaning up and repairing the damage to the building, which was not as bad as feared initially.

=== Modern period ===
The school's uptake increased at such a rate after the war that, for the first time since 1829, the main building was too small to accommodate the students. Rapid development followed, including the purchase of Beechwood, a former nursing home, in 1948 which was converted into a boarding house. A squash court was added, the nearby Grange Club was purchased in 1950 and converted into a library, land was acquired at Footes Lane for a cricket field and a new science block was built.

The 1990s saw the refurbishment of the science laboratories, improved facilities for sport and physical education and the development of a purpose-built art department. In 1992, the school accepted a group of girls into the sixth form from the relocating Blanchelande College. They were the first girls to be officially registered and receive college numbers, and provoked the first discussions about the possibility for a mixed-sex sixth form run in co-operation with the Ladies' College sixth form. Having been a boarding school since its re-chartering in 1824, the end of the 20th century saw a gradual decline in the number of children being sent to the island to board, not helped by the increasingly high fares on air and sea routes from the mainland. There was also a growing requirement for independent infant schooling in Guernsey, and so the King's Road boarding house was reopened in October 1996 as Acorn House pre-school and pre-prep. David Toze's appointment as principal in 1998 saw a large number of changes implemented at the school. He appointed the first-ever female headteacher of Beechwood in 2000, oversaw the merging of Acorn House and Beechwood into the Elizabeth College Junior School and drove forward the link between the Ladies' and Elizabeth College sixth forms.

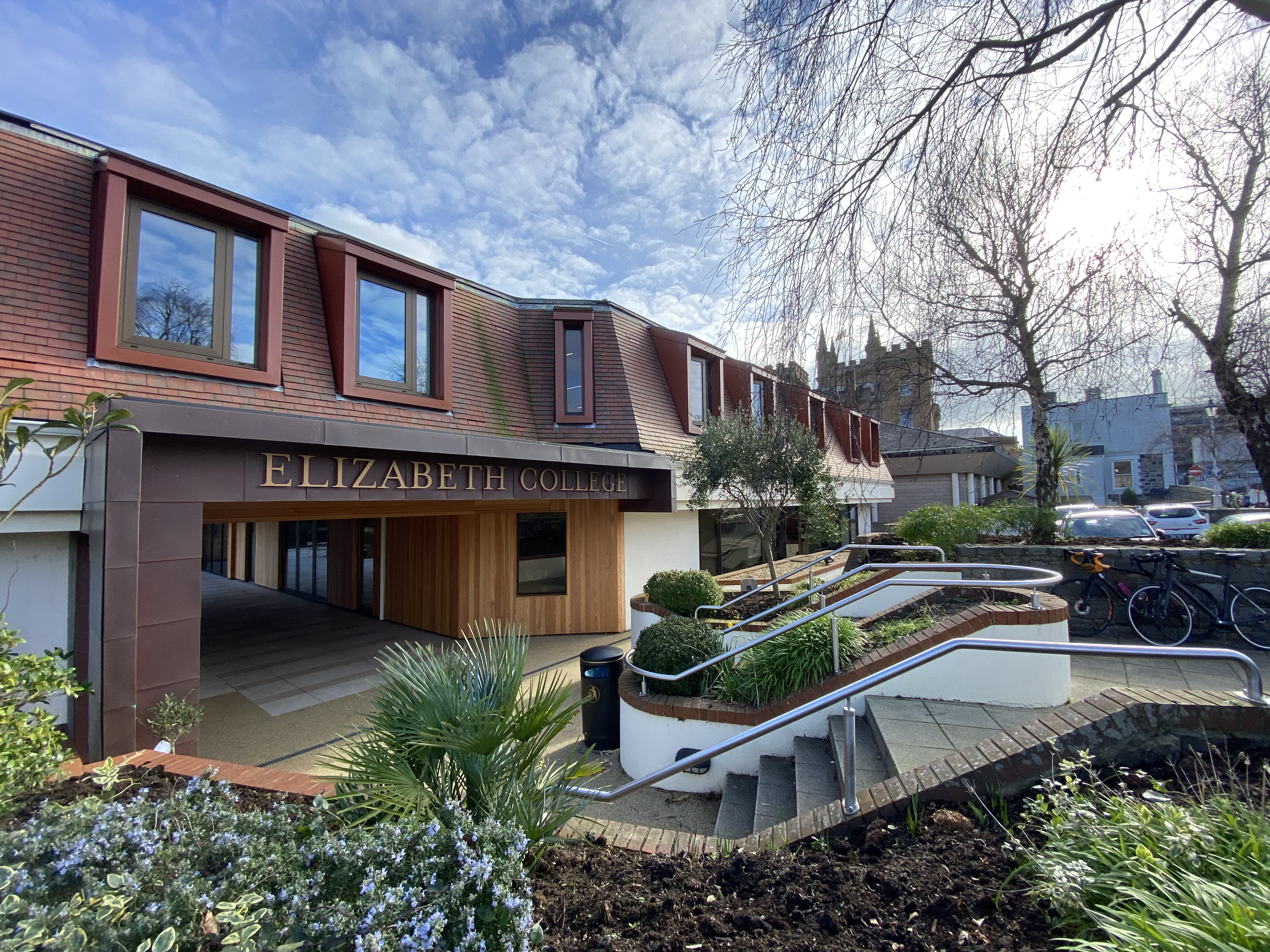
Perrot Court, opened in 2023 following the building's acquisition from the Royal Bank of Canada

Having appointed its first-ever female principal, Jenny Palmer, in 2017, in January 2020 the school announced that "in recognition of the needs of contemporary society", girls would be admitted to the upper school into year seven and into the sixth form from September 2021 as part of plans for the school to be entirely coeducational by 2025.

== School structure ==
The school operates a house system with four houses—Country, North, South and Town—referring loosely to the four parts of the island. (Note: There were previously five school houses, including "School House" which comprised boarders at the school. A sixth house, "New House", was formed in 1960, before New and School were closed in 1999.) Previously, pupils were assigned to a house based on where they and their families lived, but are now assigned arbitrarily. Year groups are divided into four roughly equal-sized tutor groups divided by house, each overseen by a dedicated tutor.

Teaching at the school is delivered over thirty-five periods per week, divided into 45-minute lessons in years seven and eleven and between 45 and 55 minutes in the sixth form, with a typical school day starting at 8:25 am and finishing at 4 pm. Lower down the school, students are divided into class groups by house, except for creative subjects which are taught in smaller mixed-ability groups. Further up the school, however, class groups combine students from all four houses and are determined by ability and/or subject choice.

== Governance ==
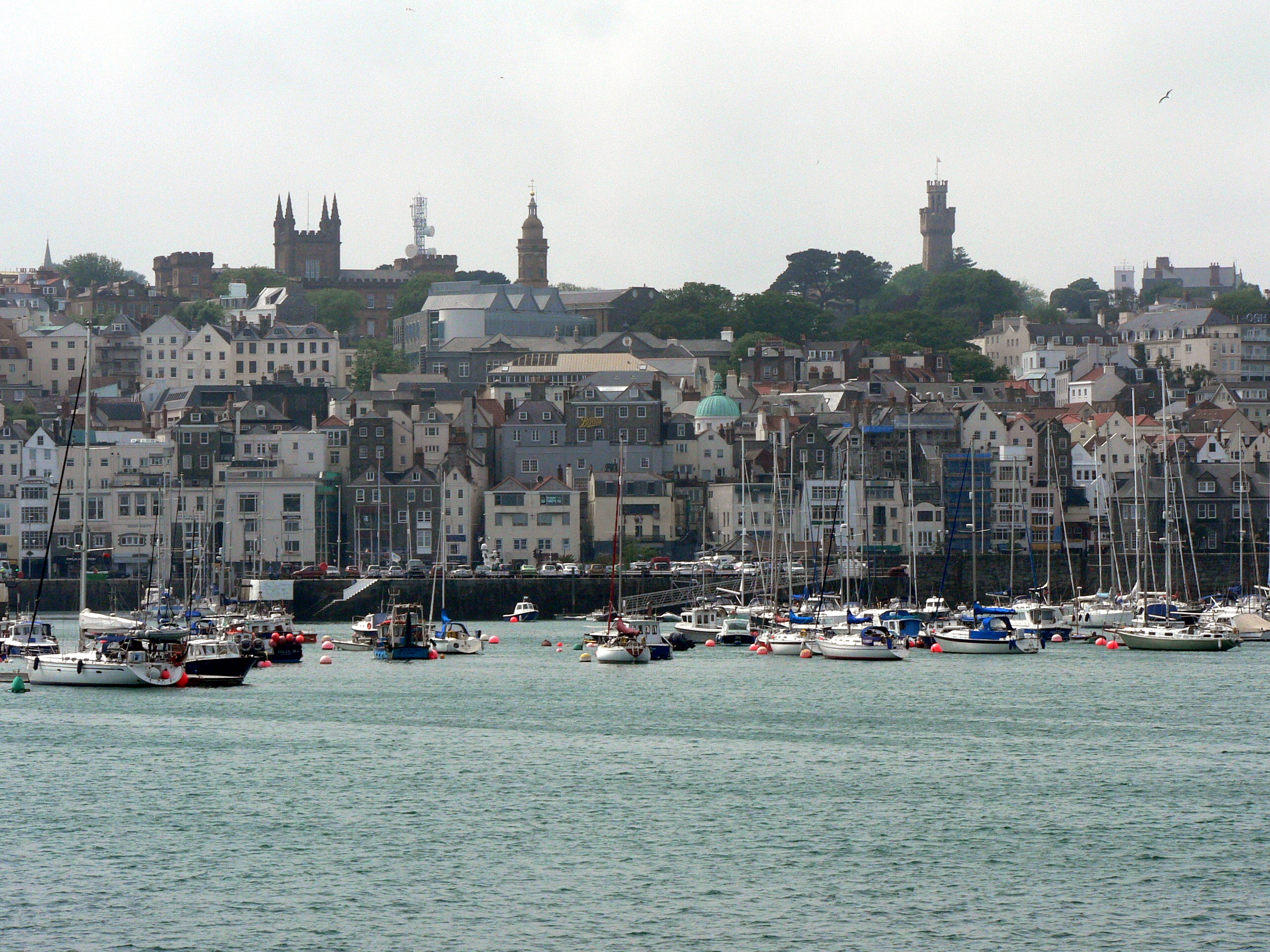
The school's main building on the skyline of Saint Peter Port from the east coast of the island

Governance is delivered by a board of between nine and twelve directors who serve for a six-year term, with the exception of the Dean of Guernsey, who acts as chairman. In addition to the Dean, two directors are appointed by the Lieutenant Governor and six are elected by the States of Guernsey. Several of the school's directors are former pupils of the school and parents of current pupils. These directors are required to meet both UK and Guernsey safeguarding standards. The school's permanent visitor is the Bishop of Winchester.

The school is located on the island of Guernsey, which forms the major part of the Bailiwick of Guernsey, a self-governing dependency of the British Crown which does not form part of the United Kingdom. The school is therefore not subject to the jurisdiction of the UK's Department for Education nor UK regulations regarding independent schools. Instead, it is accredited as a British school overseas under a voluntary accreditation scheme run by the Department for Education with standards which follow the framework and guidance for English independent schools.

One of the earliest members of the HMC (The Heads' Conference), it is a public school in the British sense of the term. It is one of the oldest schools in the British Isles and the oldest public school in the Channel Islands.

The school has charitable status in both the UK and Guernsey. In 2007 the school established The Elizabeth College Foundation (Guernsey registered charity CH91) and The Elizabeth College UK Foundation (a UK registered charity 1120954).

== Admissions ==
The school admits pupils between ages 11 and 18. It is selective, meaning prospective pupils must pass an entrance exam to be offered a place. Candidates for entry at age 11 sit an entrance assessment in November prior to entry in the following September which tests English, mathematics and verbal reasoning, while entry into the sixth form at 16 is based upon GCSE results. As of 2021, enrolment was 420 between years seven and eleven, and 147 in the sixth form, totalling 567.

The school accepts pupils with a wide ability range, though the results of standardised tests indicated that the average ability of pupils at the senior school was well above the national average of pupils in secondary schools in the UK, and the average ability of sixth-form pupils is also above the national average of the UK. Pupils come from a broad range of social and cultural backgrounds.

As of 2024/2025, the school charges £5,216 per term with three terms per academic year.

== Curriculum ==
=== Structure ===
The school designs its own curriculum based on the English National Curriculum. The school's curriculum was described by an Independent Schools Inspectorate (ISI) report in October 2015 as providing "an excellent range of options" and a "flexible pattern of pupil grouping ... so that the specific needs of subjects are strongly met". PSHE lessons are timetabled for all years below the sixth form, and specialist themed days are hosted further up the school. Approximately 40% of pupils at the school learn how to play a musical instrument, and the ISI noted in October 2015 that "many pupils achieve distinctions and merits in their instrumental music examinations".

Assessing the quality of educational provision, in October 2015 the ISI awarded the school the highest rating of excellent in eight aspects and good in the other two. The inspection stated that "[i]n many academic ... activities pupils demonstrate high levels of knowledge and understanding as well as being both highly literate and articulate". The report praised the school for delivering the curriculum with "good teaching throughout". The breadth of the curriculum was described as "a significant strength" of the school, furthered by the co-educational sixth form partnership with the Ladies' College. The strength of the curriculum for informing the pupils' cultural awareness, in particular with appreciating Guernsey's own customs and culture in addition to other cultures, was also observed, with the cultural development of pupils being described as excellent. A subsequent report by the ISI in 2021 found that "[p]upils of all ages and abilities develop comprehensive subject knowledge, skills and understanding across all areas of learning, appropriately challenged by teaching that addresses linguistic, mathematical, scientific, technological, human and social, physical and aesthetic and creative aspects of learning."

=== Examinations ===
As of 2015, students typically sit ten or more GCSEs and three or four A-levels. Most pupils who leave the school after A-level study proceed to university or other further education and nine out of ten leavers secure places at their first choice UK universities.

Between 2013 and 2017, the school's GCSE pass rates (of 5 grades 9–4/A*–C including English and Maths) were between 91% and 99%; the national average of the Bailiwick of Guernsey over the same period ranged from 57% to 67%. In 2009, "value-added" statistics, which compare results at GCSE and A-level against expectations for pupils based on assessment when they joined the school, placed Elizabeth College in the top 17% of British schools.

Analysing examination results between 2012 and 2014, the 2015 ISI inspection found that "around half of [GCSE] grades achieved were A* and A grades", that "GCSE performance has been above the UK average for boys in maintained schools" and that "IGCSE results in history and maths have been higher than ... worldwide norms". That inspection also found that "A-level results have been above the UK average for boys in maintained schools" and that over that period "just under three-quarters of the grades were in the range A* to B".

== Extracurricular activities ==
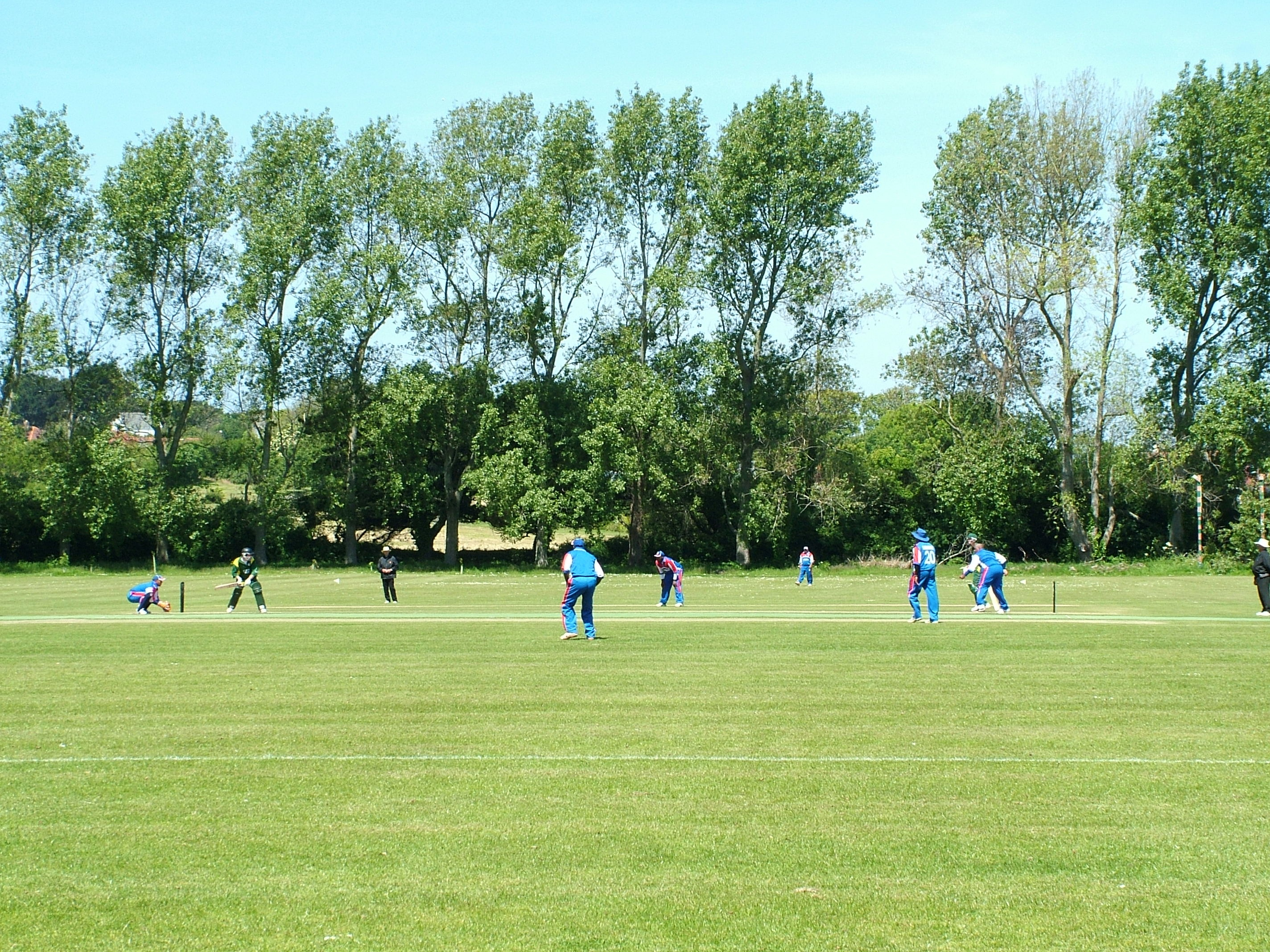
The College Field, where students play cricket during the summer term

The school focuses on hockey, football and cricket in each school term, respectively, although other sports and outdoor activities are offered. The school participates in The Duke of Edinburgh's Award scheme. The Cricketer magazine named Elizabeth College as one of the top 100 cricketing secondary schools for 2019, 2021, 2022 and 2023.

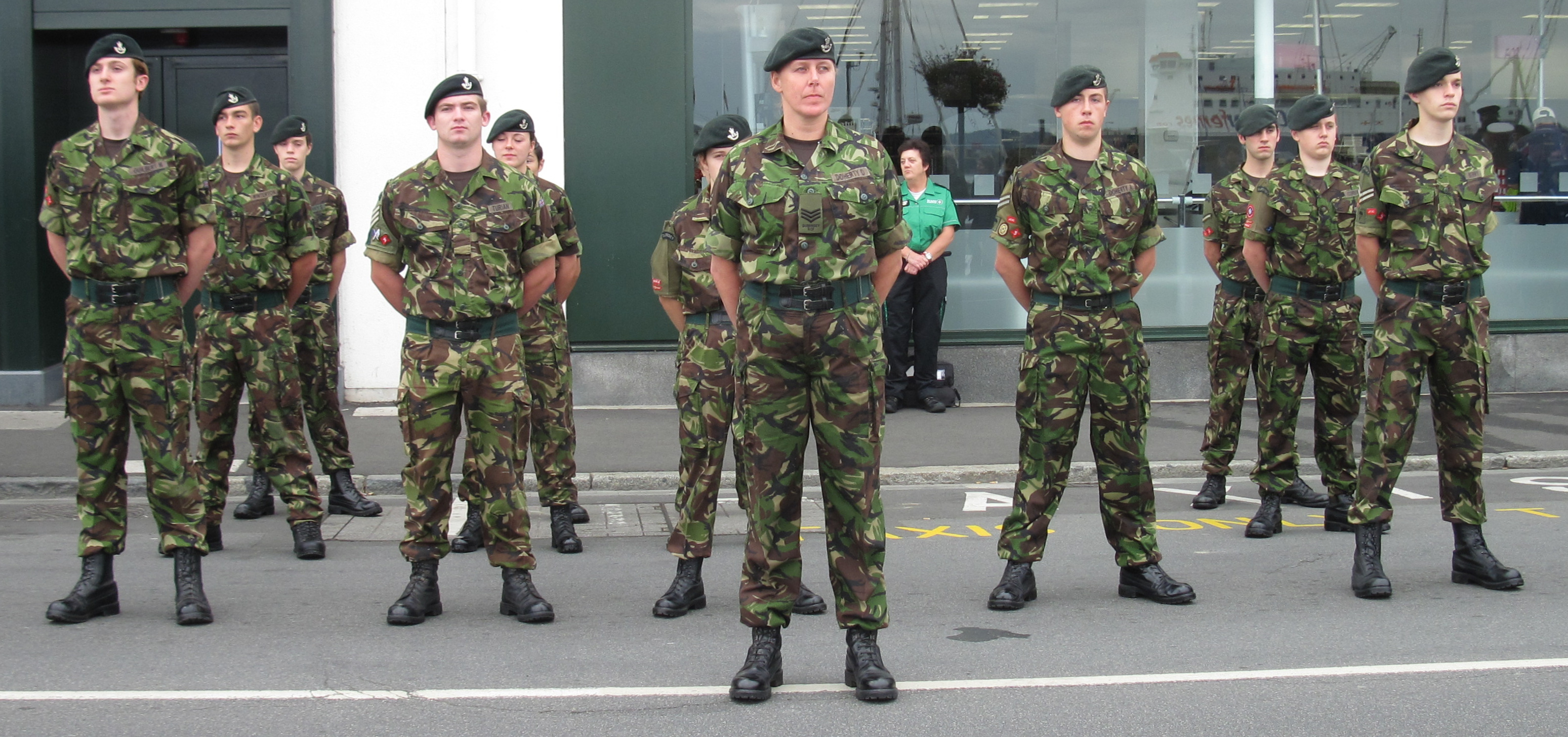
The school's CCF frequently takes part in local parades and services.

Founded in 1902, the school's Combined Cadet Force (CCF) performs traditional military and ceremonial duties in the island, including the Liberation Day, Queen's Birthday and Remembrance Day parades. Since 1951, it has been the only uniformed military body in the island and provides guards of honour for visiting members of the British royal family. The school has achieved considerable success in rifle shooting and has attended the schools' meeting at Bisley since 1906. Several students have represented the British Cadet Rifle Team and the Great Britain Under-19 Rifle Team.

== Buildings and sites ==
The school's main site overlooks the town of Saint Peter Port. It includes an indoor sports hall, a hardcourt, a pool and an indoor 25 yard .22 rifle range. Adjacent to the main site, the school owns property in Upland Road. In 2020, the school purchased property to the north of the main site, formerly occupied by the Royal Bank of Canada, which was named Perrot Court in honour of major donor and alumnus, Roger Perrot.

The design of the main building has polarised critics across generations: Henry Inglis, writing in 1835, thought it "an attractive object" and "decidedly handsome"; Ansted and Latham, in their 1862 publication The Channel Islands, describe it as "unfortunately harmonising in its utter tastelessness", being "erected at great cost" and presenting "a bald, plastered, unmeaning face, too prominent to be overlooked"; whilst Sir Charles Brett, in 1972, described it as "a formidable stucco composition in a sort of Tudor style ... a less distinguished exercise than many of the same period to be found in mainland Britain; but ... an imposing piece of scenery nonetheless, and important to the townscape". In 1846, Queen Victoria, writing in her diary whilst aboard the royal yacht anchored in the Little Roussel, noted the "predominance" of the college in a "St Pierre, so very picturesque."

Away from the main site, the school owns playing fields and sports facilities in St Peter Port – namely the College Field and the Memorial Field – both of which are used throughout the year for the school's three main sports. The weekly whole-school assembly is held at the nearby St James concert hall.

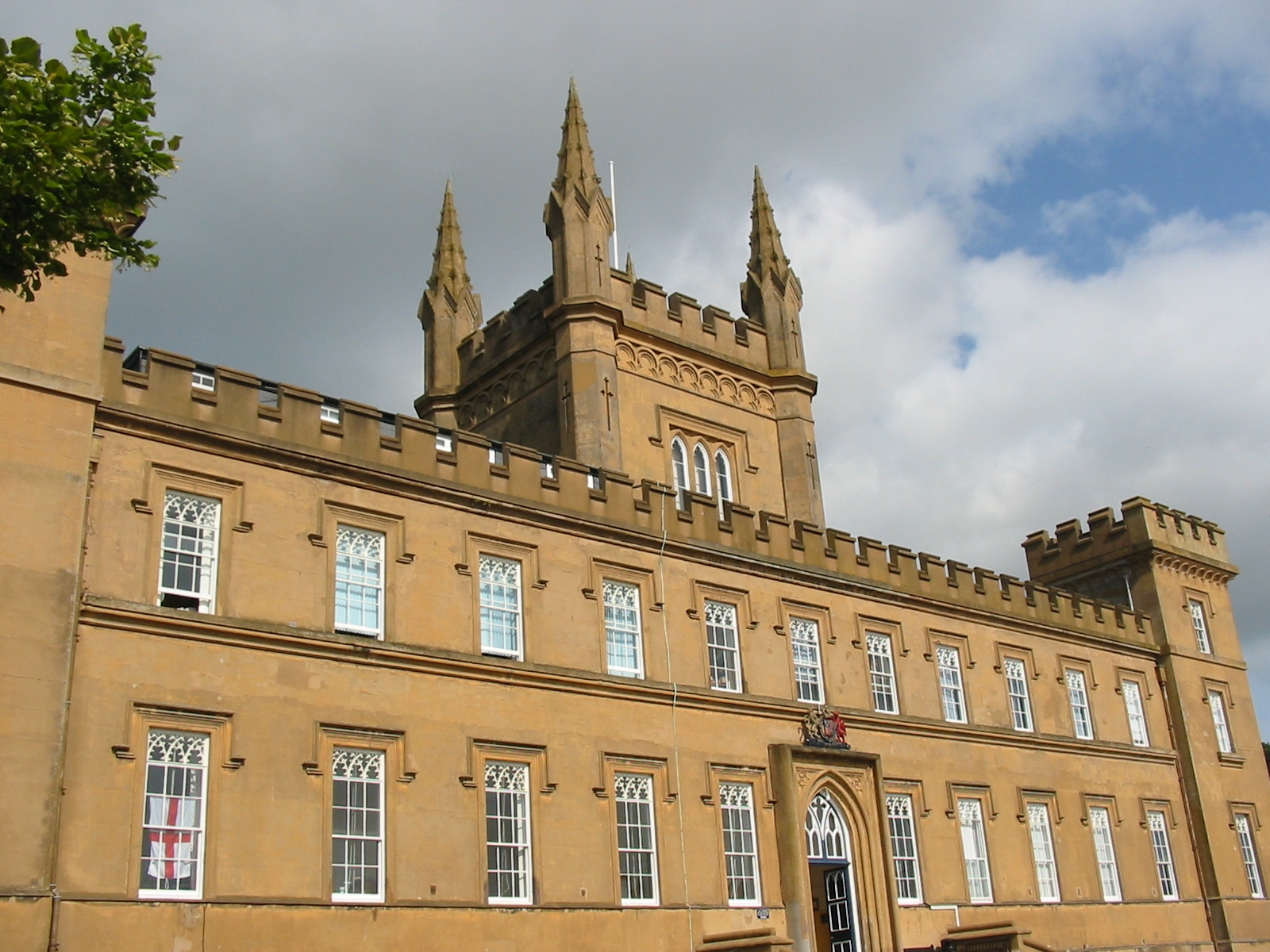

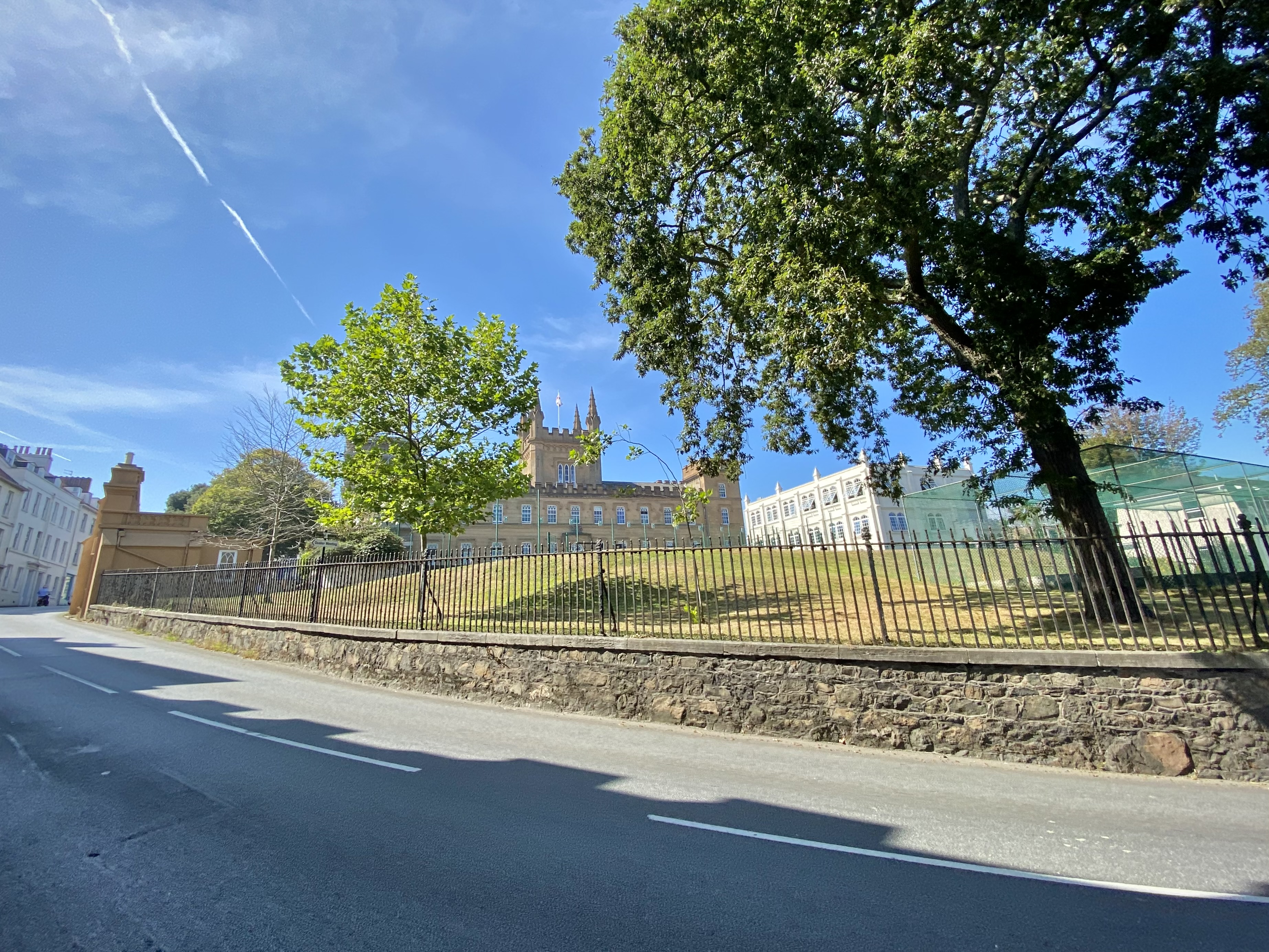

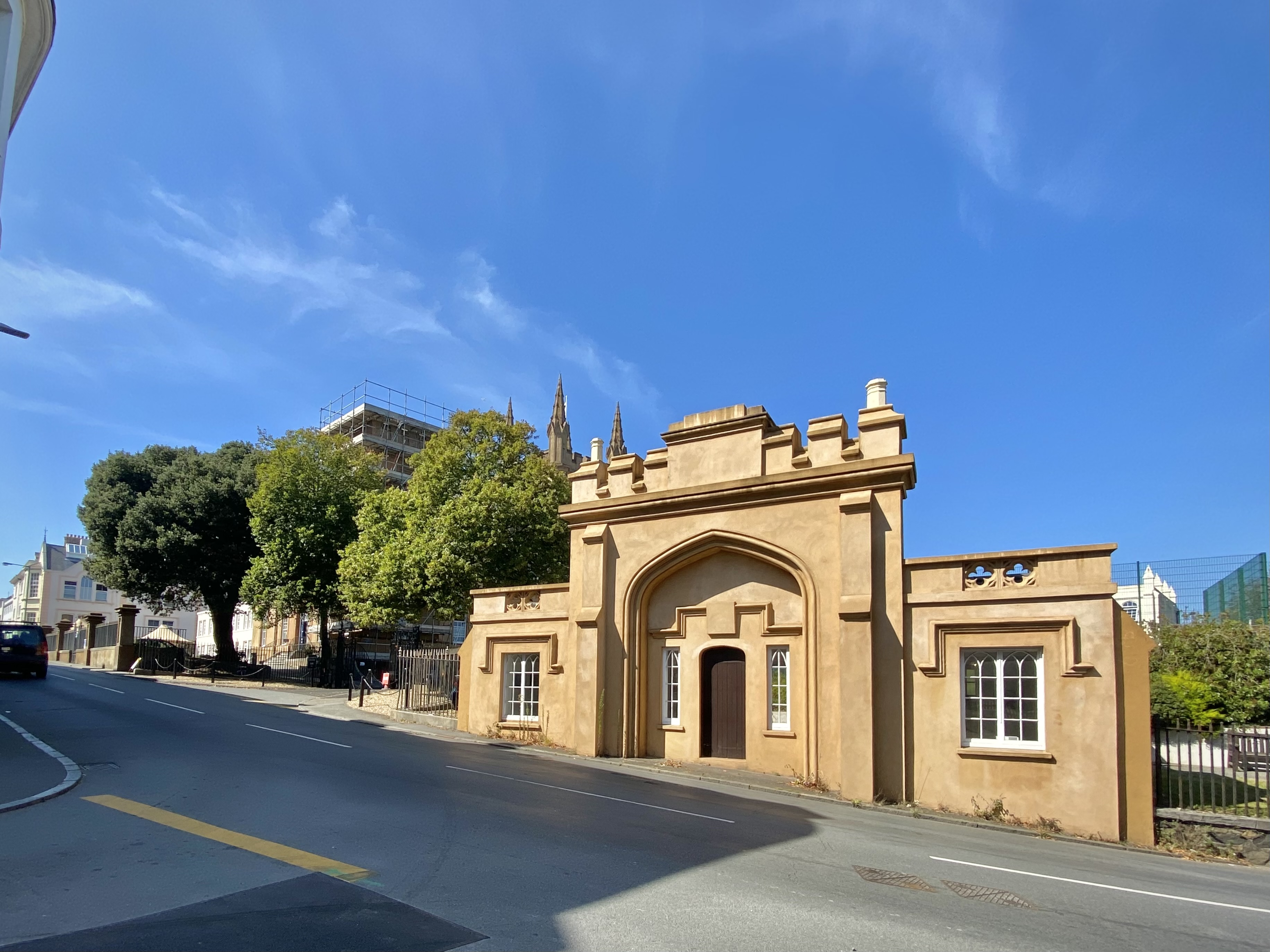
The school's main building and gatehouse, finished in 1829

== Notable alumni ==
The school's alumni are referred to as Old Elizabethans.

Notable alumni of the school in the military include four Victoria Cross holders, Duncan Home (1841–1843), John McCrea (1864–1872), Lewis Halliday (1880–1888) and Wallace Le Patourel (1926–1934). Other alumni in the military include British Army officers Terence O'Brien (1843–1844), Herbert Abbott (1867–1872) and Donald Banks (1899–1909), RAF officer and heir to the Seigneur of Sark, Francis William Beaumont (1917–1919), Air Chief Marshal Sir Peter Le Cheminant (1929–1938), Indian army officer Horace Searle Anderson (1844–1849), and Chief Commissioner of Police in South Australia, William John Peterswald (1844–1846).

The school has educated many Bailiffs of Guernsey, including Thomas Godfrey Carey (1842–1849), William Carey (1863–1872), Havilland Walter de Sausmarez (1869–1873), Victor Gosselin Carey (1880–1883), Ambrose Sherwill (1903–1904), Sir Geoffrey Rowland (1959–1965) and Sir Richard Collas (1960–1971). British Members of Parliament educated at the school include Conservative politician Edward Arthur Somerset (1829–1831), Liberal party politician Walter Wren (1848–1850) and Labour politician Malcolm Wicks (1961–1964). Lord Justice of Appeal for England and Wales, Adrian Fulford was educated at the school (1966–1971).

Alumni in the arts include actors Barry Jones (1902–1909) and Robert Morley (1921–); authors William Adolf Baillie Grohman (1867–1869) and P.G. Wodehouse (1890–1892); artist and great-grandson of Victor Hugo, Jean Hugo (1907–1910); journalist and novelist Robert Sherard (1875–1878) and engineer, socialist and author Hugh Pembroke Vowles (1898–1900).

Other alumni include explorer Edmund Kennedy (1830–1834). clergyman, historian and social activist, James Parkes (1905–1915); Bishop of Blackburn, Nicholas Reade (1960–1965); academics John Richard Magrath (1848–1856) and James Jérémie (1916–1921); historian, theologian and mountaineer W. A. B. Coolidge (1866–1869); television presenters Bruce Parker (1948–1960) and Murray Dron (1988–1993); and media magnate Ashley Highfield (1977–1982).

Alumni in the sciences includes physician and academic author Dr Norman Hay Forbes (1875–1880); anthropologist Arthur Maurice Hocart (1899–1902); egyptologist Sir Peter le Page Renouf (1831–1840); geologist Nick McCave (1949–1960); plastic surgeon Simon Kay (1959–1965); and nuclear physicist Ian Chapman (1993–2000).

Notable school alumni in sport include footballers Craig Allen (1985–1992) and Chris Tardif (1991–1996); multiple world champion racing driver Andy Priaulx (1984–1989); athletes Dale Garland (1992–1999), Cameron Chalmers (2001–2015) and Alastair Chalmers (2004–2018); cricketers George Bailey (1866–1870) and Tim Ravenscroft (1996–2010); dressage rider and multiple Olympic gold-medallist Carl Hester (1978–1983); squash player Chris Simpson (1994–2003); cyclist Tobyn Horton (1994–2003); and target-rifle shooters Charles Trotter (1936–1941) and Peter Jory (1981–1992).

== Principals ==
The school's first principal (then known as the master) was Adrian Saravia. From Saravia's departure up to the 1824 re-chartering, the record of principals is uncertain. Charles Stocker was the first principal appointed after the re-chartering. Since his appointment, portraits have been made of every principal except for George Proctor. These portraits are displayed in the Le Marchant library. In 2017, Jenny Palmer became the first female principal in the school's history.

== See also ==
- Education in Guernsey
- Upper Canada College, founded 1829 and modelled after Elizabeth College
