= John Wilson (English architect) =

- Born: 6 June 1781; Cardewlees, Dalston, Cumberland
- Died: 2 January 1866 (aged 84); Shirley, Southampton, Hampshire
- Occupation: Architect
- Buildings: Elizabeth College, Guernsey; St James, Guernsey; Castle Carey; Meat Market (1822)

John Wilson (1781, Dalston, Cumbria – 1866, Shirley, Hampshire) was a Clerk of Works for the Board of Ordnance who became one of the most celebrated architects in the island of Guernsey for the buildings he designed there between 1813 and 1831.

He worked mostly in stucco (which he called 'Roman cement') in the neoclassical, Gothic Revival or Jacobethan styles.

Despite the recognition of his work in Guernsey, he appears to have done little work outside the island and remains a rather elusive figure.

== Early life ==
John Wilson was born in Dalston, Cumbria, and baptised on the 6 June 1781, the son of Robert and Mary Wilson of Cardewlees. In 1816, he married Ann Strong, the daughter of John Strong, a solicitor of Carlisle, at the church of St George's, Hanover Square, London.

He joined the Board of Ordnance as a mason. He had been promoted to master mason, and was appointed Clerk of Works by 1813.

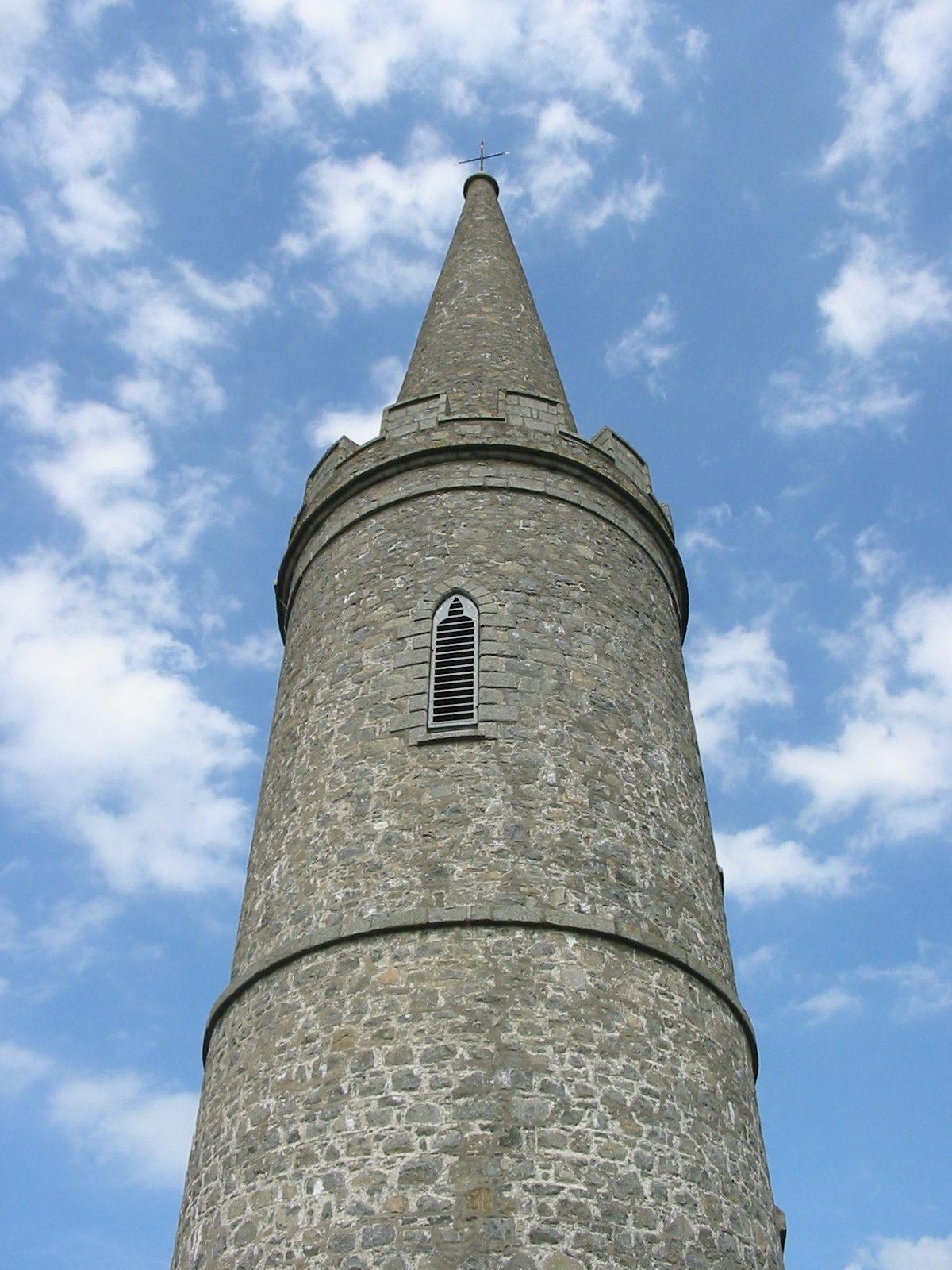
Torteval Church

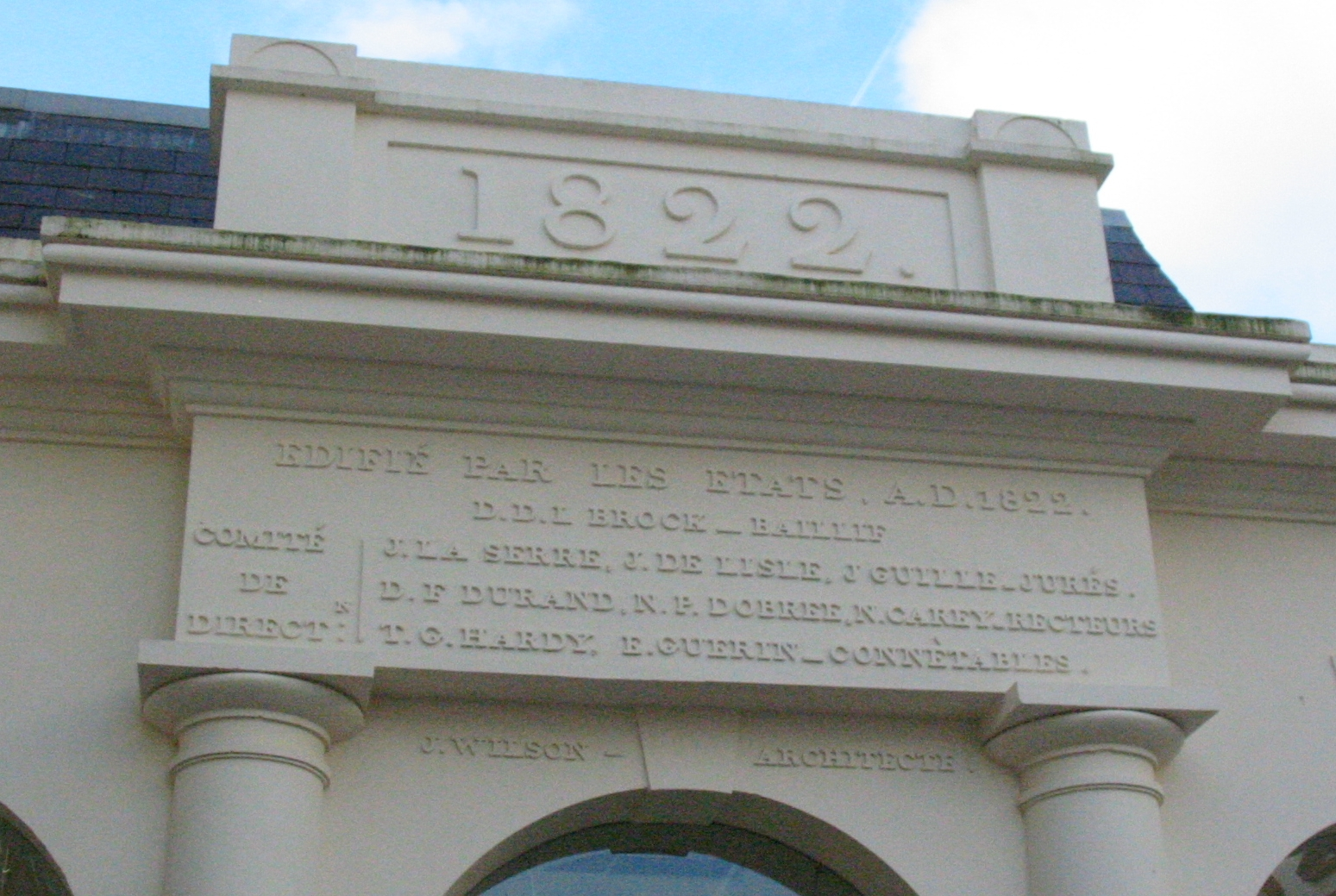
Meat Market (1822)

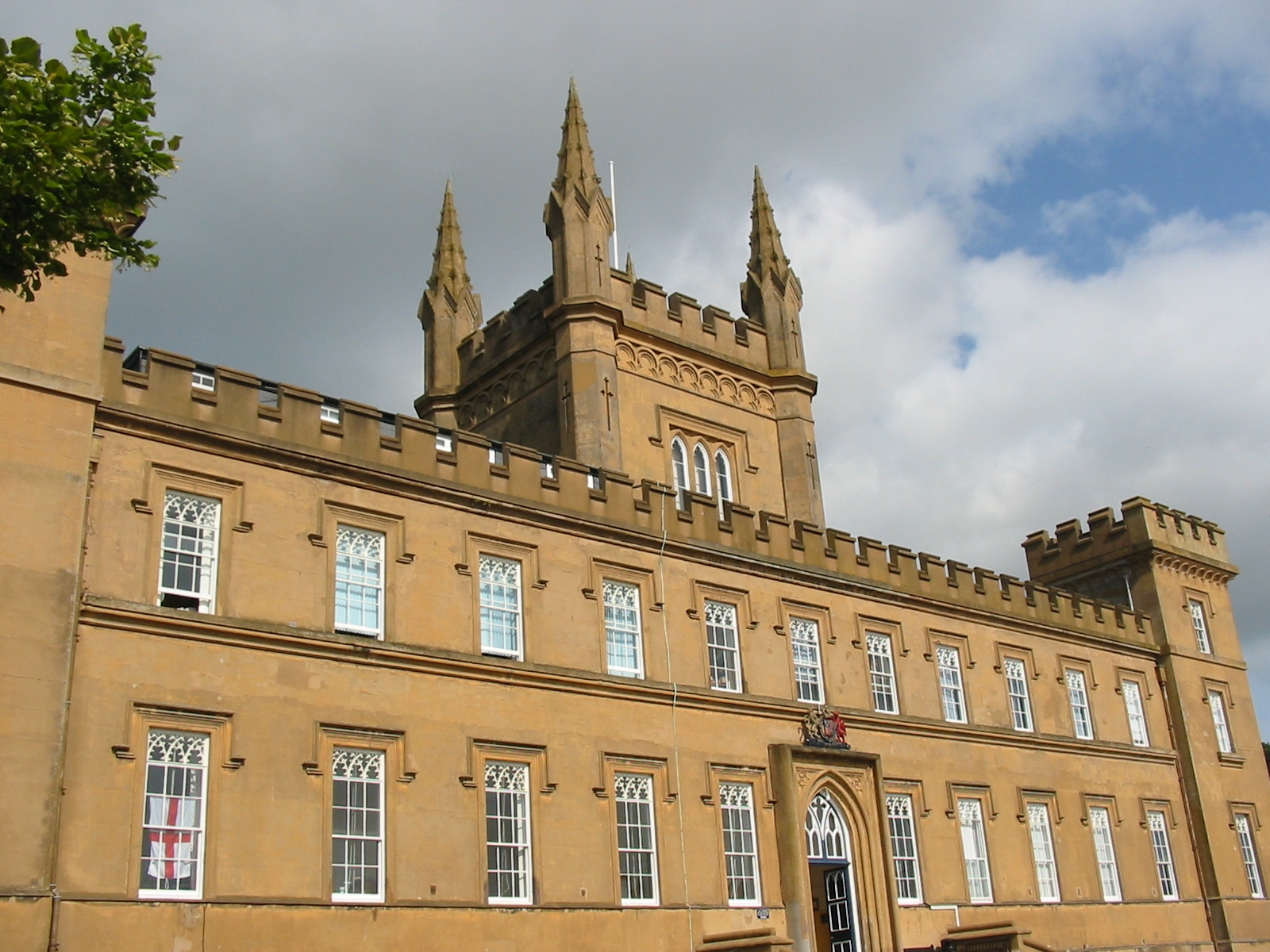
Elizabeth College

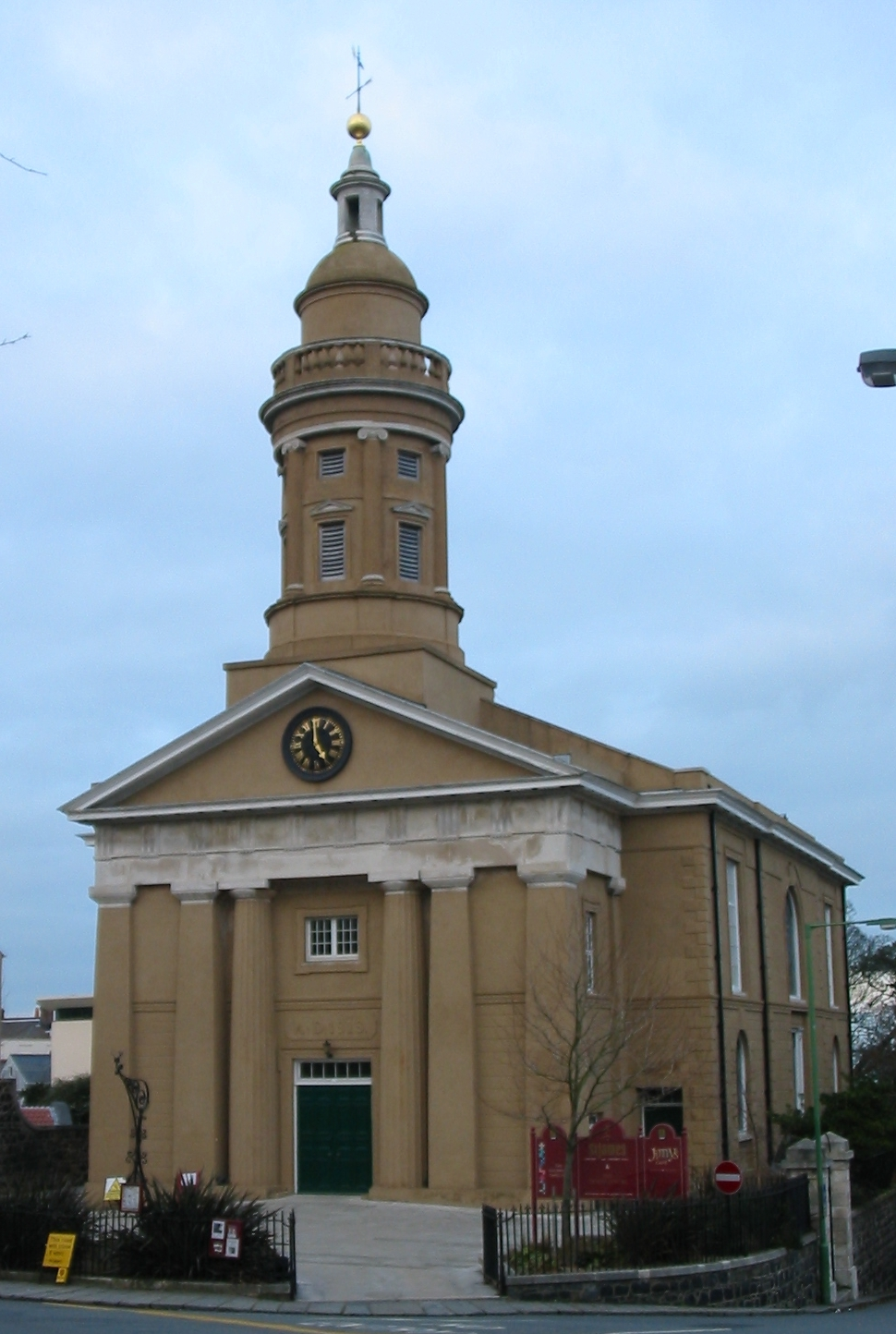
St James, Gurnsey

== Work in Guernsey (1813–1830) ==
He was sent to Guernsey in about 1813 to supervise the construction of permanent barracks for the garrison in Guernsey and Alderney.

His work with the Board of Ordnance allowed him time to take on private commissions, and his first major project was Torteval Church.

== Notable works ==
- Torteval Church, Guernsey (1816)
- St James, Guernsey (1818)
- Town Church, Guernsey – repairs and renovation on this medieval church
- Meat Market, Guernsey (1822) – described as 'one of the most convenient, both for the buyers and sellers, that can be found in any part of the world... Much praise is due to the architect, Mr J Wilson.'
- Castle Carey, L'Hyvreuse, St Peter Port
- Les Arcades, Guernsey
- Fountain Street, St Peter Port – as part of a slum clearance programme, the street was widened from eight to thirty feet.
- Elizabeth College (1828)

== Other works ==
- Map of Guernsey for William Berry's History of Guernsey (1815).

== Subsequent career (1830–1845) ==
In 1831, he informed the Elizabeth College board that he was being transferred to Scotland.

In 1837, he was transferred to Woolwich Arsenal, from where he retired in 1845 on the grounds of ill health.

After he left Guernsey, he was not permitted to take on private commissions, and his only known work in England is a memorial to Sir Alexander Dickson, erected in Woolwich in 1841, and subsequently moved to the Royal School of Artillery in Larkhill, Wiltshire.

== Retirement (1845–1866) ==
Wilson retired to Southampton, where he lived in Cardew Villa, Shirley, Southampton in Hampshire. He died in 1866, the same year as his wife, Ann. In his will, he left £12,000 to his great-nephew and namesake to purchase an estate in his native Cumberland.

== Legacy ==
In his 1975 survey of the architecture of St Peter Port, Guernsey, Sir Charles Brett concluded that Wilson was 'certainly the most important figure in Guernsey's architectural development'.
