= Cardewlees =

Hamlet in Cumbria, England

Coordinates: 54.851°N 3.014°W

- Hamlet
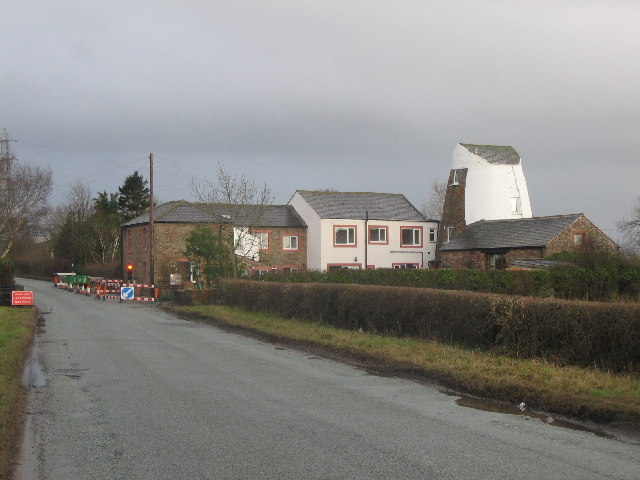
- Windmill at Cardewlees

- Location in the former Carlisle district, Cumbria Location within Cumbria
- OS grid reference: NY349511
- Civil parish: Dalston
- Unitary authority: Cumberland
- Ceremonial county: Cumbria
- Region: North West
- Country: England
- Sovereign state: United Kingdom
- Post town: CARLISLE
- Postcode district: CA5
- Dialling code: 01228
- Police: Cumbria
- Fire: Cumbria
- Ambulance: North West
- UK Parliament: Carlisle

Cardewlees is a hamlet in Cumbria, England, historically part of Cumberland. It is about 4.5 miles (7 km) southwest of Carlisle. It is located northwest of Dalston (of which parish it belongs to), north of Cardew and northeast of Thursby, just off the A595 road. A windmill located here has been converted into apartments. Thursby Manor is located nearby. Cardewlees hit the headlines in 1862 when resident Sarah Carrick poisoned herself with phosphorus paste, or rat poison.

Archaeologically it is known for The Cardewlees Altar.

== Notable people ==
It is the birthplace of John Wilson, an architect with the Board of Ordnance who was responsible for some of the Regency buildings in the island of Guernsey.

== See also ==
- List of places in Cumbria
