= List of Principals of Elizabeth College, Guernsey =

Since its foundation in 1563, Elizabeth College has had 42 principals overseeing the running of the school. The principal was formerly known as the master of the school. Since the appointment of Rev. Dr Charles Stocker as principal in 1824, portraits have been made of every principal of the school, except Rev. George Proctor. These are kept in the Le Marchant library, situated at the very top of the middle spire of the main building.

== List of principals ==
| Title | Principal | Period | Notes | Reference |
|---|---|---|---|---|
| Dr | Adrian Saravia | 1563–1568 | The school's first master, Saravia left the island in 1571, describing the local population as an 'uncivilised race' which 'hates all learning'. He went on to become one of the translators of the King James Bible. | |
| Mr | William Hart | c. 1581 | | |
| Rev. | George Capelin | 1589–1591 | | |
| Mr | Martin de Pestere | 1599–1606 | | |
| Rev. | Simon Hern | 1606–1608 | | |
| Rev. | William West | 1608–1609 | | |
| Mr | Amos Horn | c. 1610 | | |
| Mr | Jean Ganrey | 1613–1614 | | |
| Mr | Thomas Mauger | 1622–1626 | | |
| Mr | Joshua Slowley | 1627–1628 | | |
| Mr | Arthur Morehead | c. 1635 | | |
| Rev. | Isaac Basire | c. 1636 | | |
| Mr | Jacob de l'Epine | 1639–1644 | | |
| Mr | Thomas Carey | 1644–1660 | | |
| Rev. | Gabriel Du Perier | 1660–1669 | | |
| Mr | George Dalgarno | 1670–1672 | | |
| Rev. | Francis Dubois | 1672–1675 | | |
| Rev. | Nicholas Le Mesurier | 1675–1678 | | |
| Rev. | William Johnson | 1682–1698 | | |
| Mr | Jacob Bouhaut | c. 1700 | | |
| Rev. | Lawrence Payne | 1708–1714 | Payne was dismissed after he was found to have spent eighteen months absent in England while still claiming salary as a master. | |
| Mr | John Rowe | 1714–1718 | | |
| Rev. | John Le Mesurier | 1738–1759 | | |
| Rev. | John Hemming | 1759–1761 | | |
| Rev. | Elias Crespin | 1761–1795 | | |
| Rev. | Nicholas Carey | 1795–1824 | | |
| Rev. | Charles Stocker | 1824–1829 | Stocker was the College's first principal since the re-chartering of the College in 1824. He developed a reputation for 'unmerciful' flogging while applying himself to raise the academic standing of the school, as well as concentrating on the construction of the new main building. | |
| Rev. | George Proctor | 1829–1832 | | |
| Rev. | William Davies | 1832–1847 | | |
| Rev. | John Bromby | 1847–1855 | | |
| Rev. | Arthur Corfe | 1855–1868 | | |
| Rev. | John Oates | 1868–1888 | | |
| Rev. | William Penney | 1888–1924 | | |
| Rev. | Francis Hardy | 1924–1939 | | |
| Rev. | William Milnes | 1939–1957 | | |
| Mr | John Day | 1957–1971 | Day was the first principal of the College not to be an ordained member of the Church of England. | |
| Mr | Richard Wheadon | 1971–1988 | | |
| Mr | John Hubert Farre Doulton | 1988–1998 | | |
| Mr | David Toze | 1998–2001 | Toze appointed the first-ever female headteacher of Beechwood (the associated junior school) in 2000, and oversaw the merging of Acorn House and Beechwood into the Elizabeth College Junior School as well as establishing a link between The Ladies' College and Elizabeth College sixth forms. | |
| Dr | Nicholas Argent | 2001–2009 | Argent oversaw the development of the sixth form centre in the basement of the main building, opened in 2008. | |
| Mr | George Hartley | 2009–2017 | | |
| Mrs | Jenny Palmer | 2017– | Palmer was the first female principal in the school's history, and oversaw the beginning of the transition of Elizabeth College from a boys-only school into a co-educational school. | |

== Bibliography ==
- Nijenhuis, Willem (1 January 1980). Adrianus Saravia (c. 1532–1613): Dutch Calvinist, First Reformend Defender of the English Episcopal Church Order on the Basis of the Ius Divinum. BRILL. ISBN 90-04-06194-0.
- Parker, Bruce (1 December 2011). A History of Elizabeth College, Guernsey. Third Millennium Publishing. ISBN 978-1-906507-503.
- Collenette, V.G. (May 1963). Elizabeth College, 1563–1963. Guernsey Press Co Ltd.
- Rolleston, W (20 October 1926). Elizabeth College - The Centenary Commemoration of the Laying of the Foundation Stone. Guernsey: Clarke.
