= St James, Guernsey =

Former church in Saint Peter Port, Guernsey

Coordinates: 49°27′24.3″N 2°32′20″W

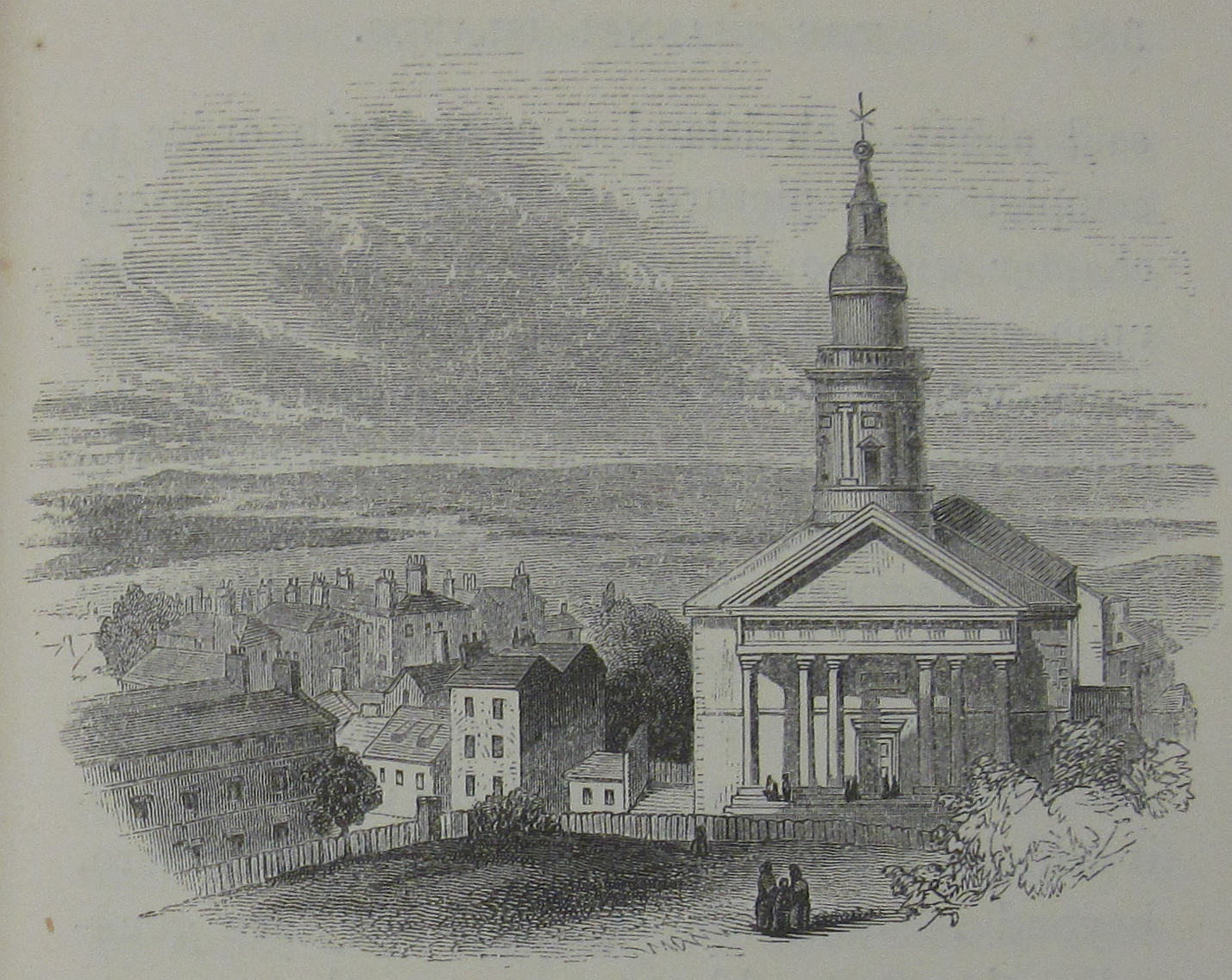
St James assembly hall, c. 1860

St James (formerly known as St James-the-Less) is a former church in Saint Peter Port, Guernsey. After falling out of use, it was converted in 1985 and is now used as a concert and assembly hall. It stands on College Street, roughly opposite Elizabeth College.

== History ==
In October 1815 Admiral James de Saumarez suggested the idea of building a church for use by the British garrison based in Guernsey where services could be held in English (as against French in other island churches). The church was designed by John Wilson and completed by 1818, at a cost of nearly £7,000.

Sketched in 1832 by J. M. W. Turner. Used as a chapel by nearby Elizabeth College.

In 1970 the church became redundant and started to decay until in 1981 The Friends of St James association was formed to restore and manage the building. The States of Guernsey agreed to pay for this restoration in 1983 and the building was officially re-opened on 5 July 1985 by the Duke of Kent. The restoration of the building winning a Civic Trust Award in 1986.

In 2002 the Dorey Centre, comprising meeting rooms, café and administration offices, were completed, which gave the centre additional facilities such as exhibition space and to cater for formal dinners and weddings. The gallery was chosen to house the Guernsey Millennium Tapestry.

== Features ==
- Whittaker Hall with superb acoustics for concerts, can accommodate 576 people in theatre style seating or 217 for dinners
- Dorey Room can seat 90 people
- Founders Room can seat 35
- Walter Room, boardroom
- Rothschild Room, boardroom
- Café St James
- Bailiwick of Guernsey Millennium Tapestry

== See also ==
- St James website
- Guernsey Tapestry
- Niven, Peter, St. James, Guernsey, 2016, ISBN 978-1526200761
