= Norman Hay Forbes =

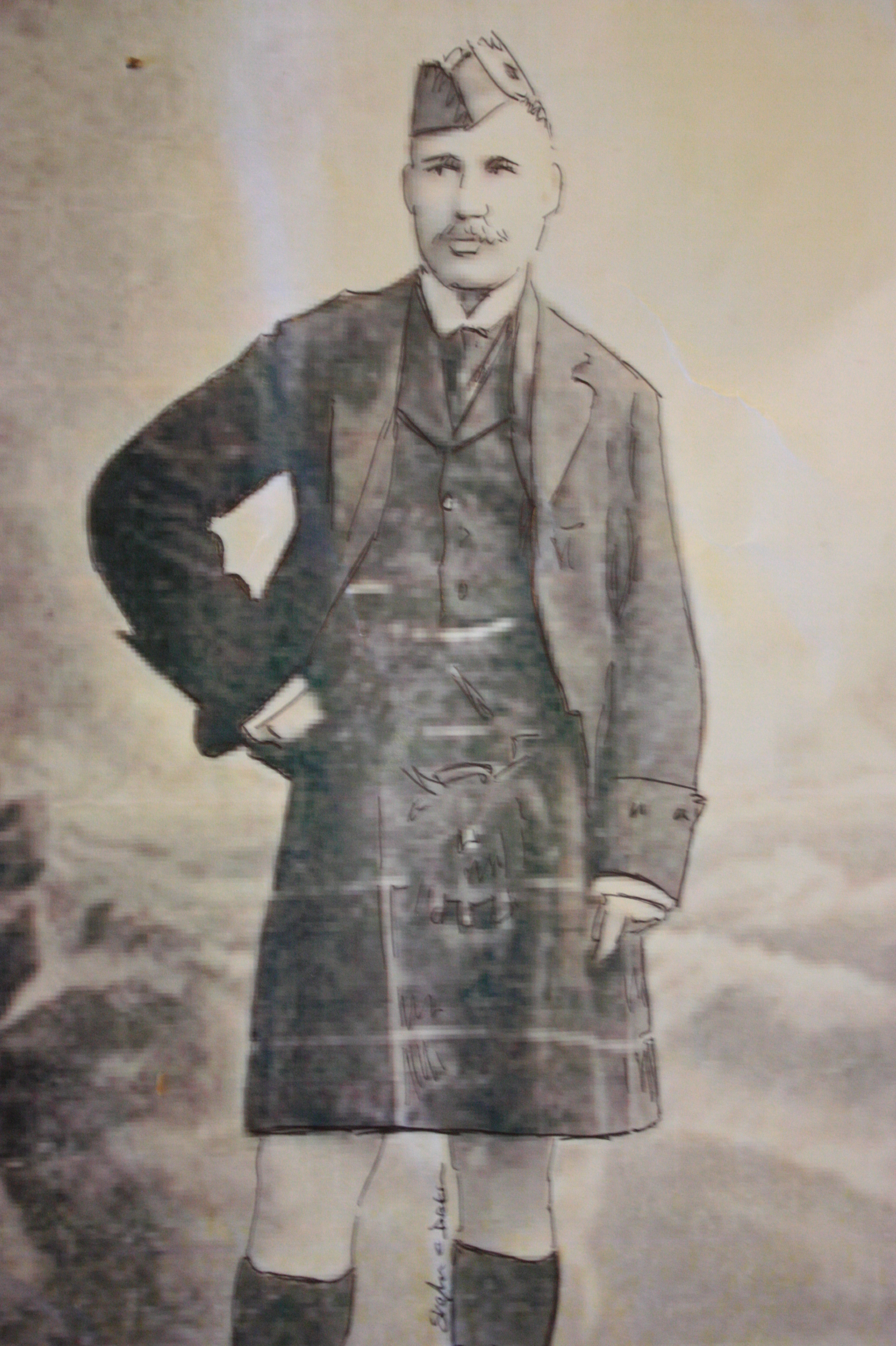
Norman Hay Forbes in 1896

Norman Hay Forbes of Forbes, FRS, FRSE, FRCSE, JP (1 March 1863 – 27 June 1916) was a British medical doctor and academic writer, often under the name of Li’mach, the war-cry of the Forbes clan. His writing ranges from therapeutic medicine to Scottish history.

== Life ==
He was born in Rawal Pindi in India on 1 March 1863. He was the son of Major Frederick Murray Hay Forbes of the Bengal Staff Corps, and his wife, Honoria Matilda Marshall, daughter of Rev William Knox Marshall and niece of Sir Henry Montgomery Lawrence.

He attended Bedford Grammar School then Elizabeth College, Guernsey. Training as a doctor he studied at the Middlesex Hospital and spent some years in the Royal Army Medical Corps before becoming a general practitioner (GP) in Church Stretton. In 1904 he was elected a Fellow of the Royal Society of Edinburgh. His proposers were Sir William Turner, Douglas Argyll Robertson, Robert C Maclagan and Thomas Annandale.

He was official Examiner to the St John’s Ambulance Association, and was appointed a Knight of Justice of the Order of Saint John of Jerusalem in England on 13 August 1902. He was also a director of the London branch of the Highland Society.

In later life he lived in Tunbridge Wells. He died on 27 June 1916.

== Family ==
In 1897, he married Ellen Wilshin, daughter of Jason Wilshin. They had one daughter: Eilidh MacLeod Hay Forbes (1897–1970).

== Publications ==
- Highland Bagpipes (1895)
- Medical Climatology and the Principles of Climatic Treatment
- Dances of the Highlanders
- Tuberculosis in Cattle in Relation to our Meat and Milk (1899)
- Natural Therapy: A Manual of Physiotherapeutics and Climatology (1913)
