= Downtown, Gdynia =

Coordinates: 54°31′15″N 18°32′20″E

Śródmieście
- Gdynia District
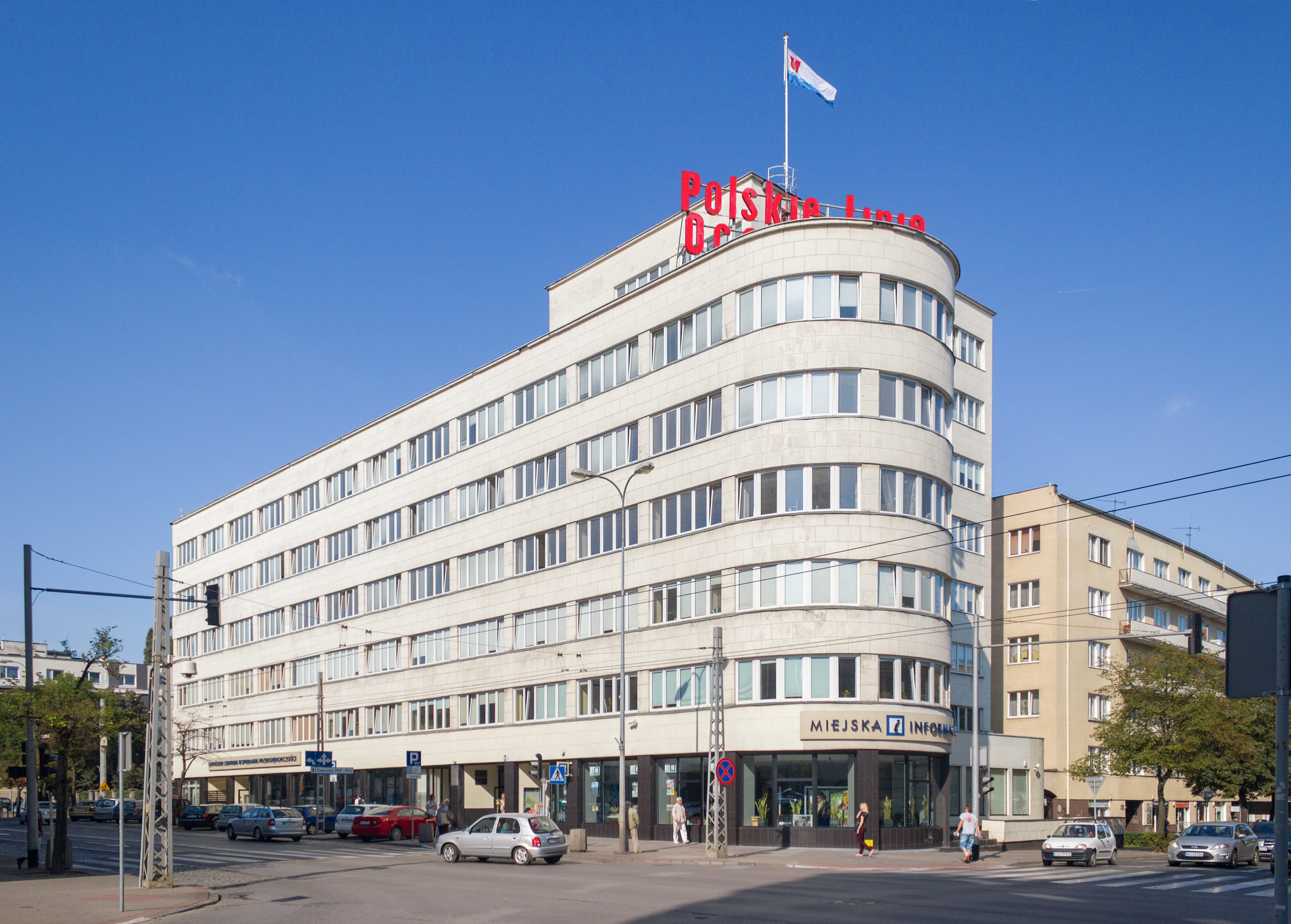
- Modernist Office building of the Social Insurance Institution

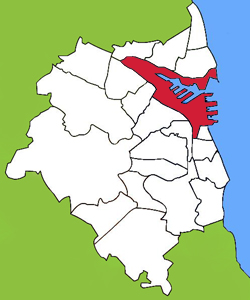
- Location of Śródmieście within Gdynia
- Country: Poland
- Voivodeship: Pomeranian
- County/City: Gdynia
- Established: 1926

Area
  - Total: 11.49 km^{2} (4.44 sq mi)

Population
  - Total: 11,549
  - Density: 1,005/km^{2} (2,603/sq mi)
- Time zone: UTC+1 (CET)
  - Summer (DST): UTC+2 (CEST)
- Website: modernizmgdyni.pl/en/

UNESCO World Heritage Site
- Official name: Gdynia Modernist City Centre
- Criteria: Cultural: iv
- Reference: 1715
- Inscription: 2026 (48th Session)

Śródmieście ([ɕrudˈmʲɛɕt͡ɕɛ], lit. 'city centre' or 'downtown') is the central borough (dzielnica) of the city of Gdynia. It borders the following districts: Oksywie, Obłuże, Pogórze (all three from the north), Chylonia, Leszczynki, Grabówek (all three from the west), Działki Leśne and Kamienna Góra (from the south), and the Baltic Sea. The modernist city centre was designated by UNESCO as a World Heritage Site in 2026.

== History ==
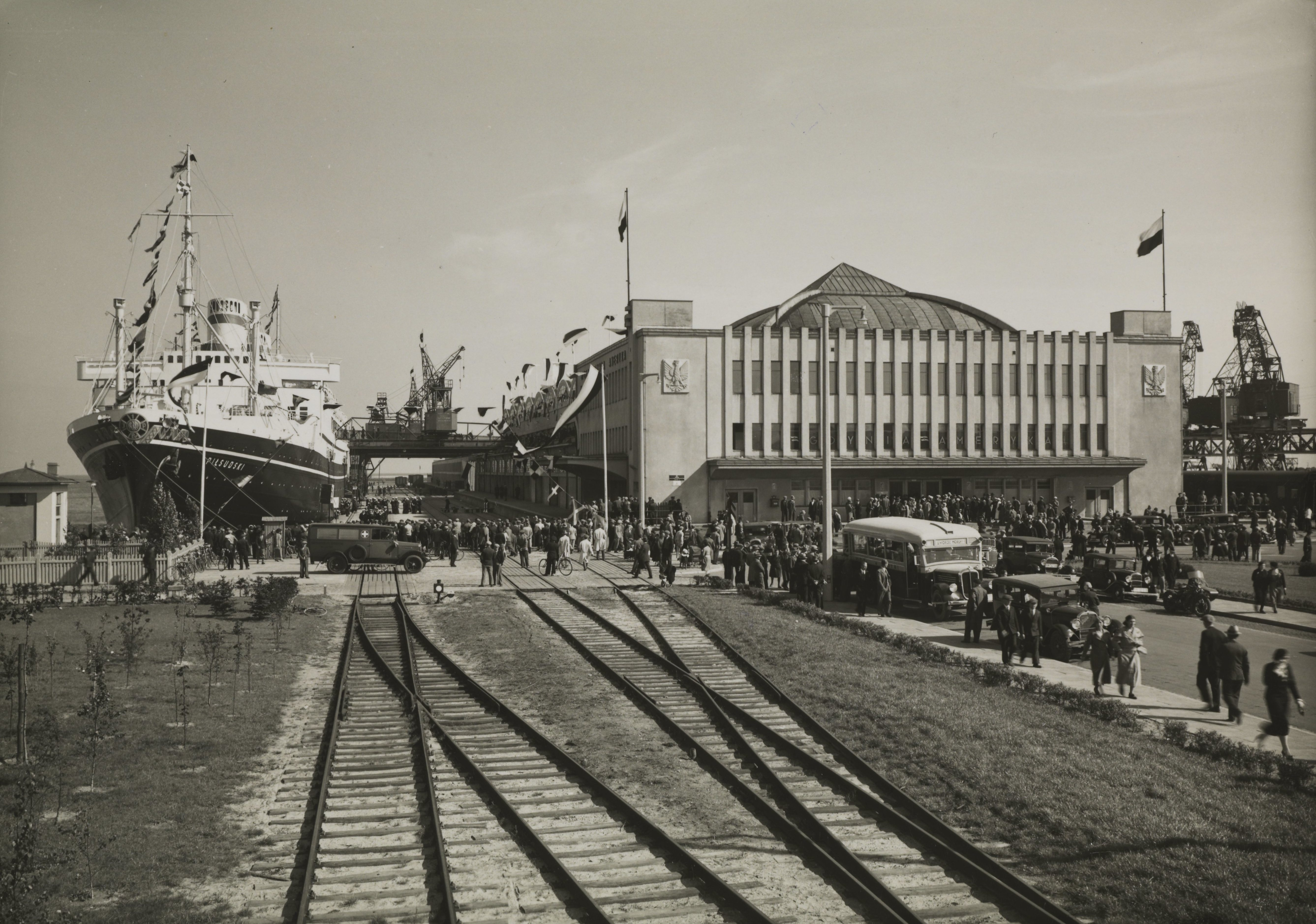
MS Piłsudski in Gdynia Seaport

Gdynia's City Centre was established mainly in the 1920s and 1930s. The modernist character of the area was created by such architects as Adam Kuncewicz and Roman Feliński.

Gdynia's core survived the war practically undamaged. During the Nazi occupation, the Germans changed the name of the district to Stadtmitte.

In 1998, the Port district was incorporated into Śródmieście. Świętojańska is the oldest and most representative street in the city.

In 2015, the modernist layout of Gdynia City Center entered the list of historical monuments of Poland.

On September 26, 2019, the Modernist Centre of Gdynia was placed on the UNESCO tentative list. According to the nomination justification, the Modernist Centre of Gdynia is unique as a heritage site of European town planning and architecture in which the ideals of Modernism have been confronted with the changing needs of a growing city and port. In July 2026, it officially became Poland's 18th UNESCO World Heritage Site.

== Preservation and documentation ==
At the end of 2021, as part of the KLIMATyczne Centrum project, the authorities of Gdynia announced the creation of new green areas, limiting car traffic and parking spaces, introducing one-way traffic on Świętojańska Street, and redevelopment of Władysława IV, Wójta Radtke, Jana z Kolna and 3 Maja Streets, several buffer car parks on the outskirts of Śródmieście, revitalisation of 10 Lutego, Starowiejska and Abrahama Streets, changes to Kaszubski Square and Aleja Jana Pawła II.

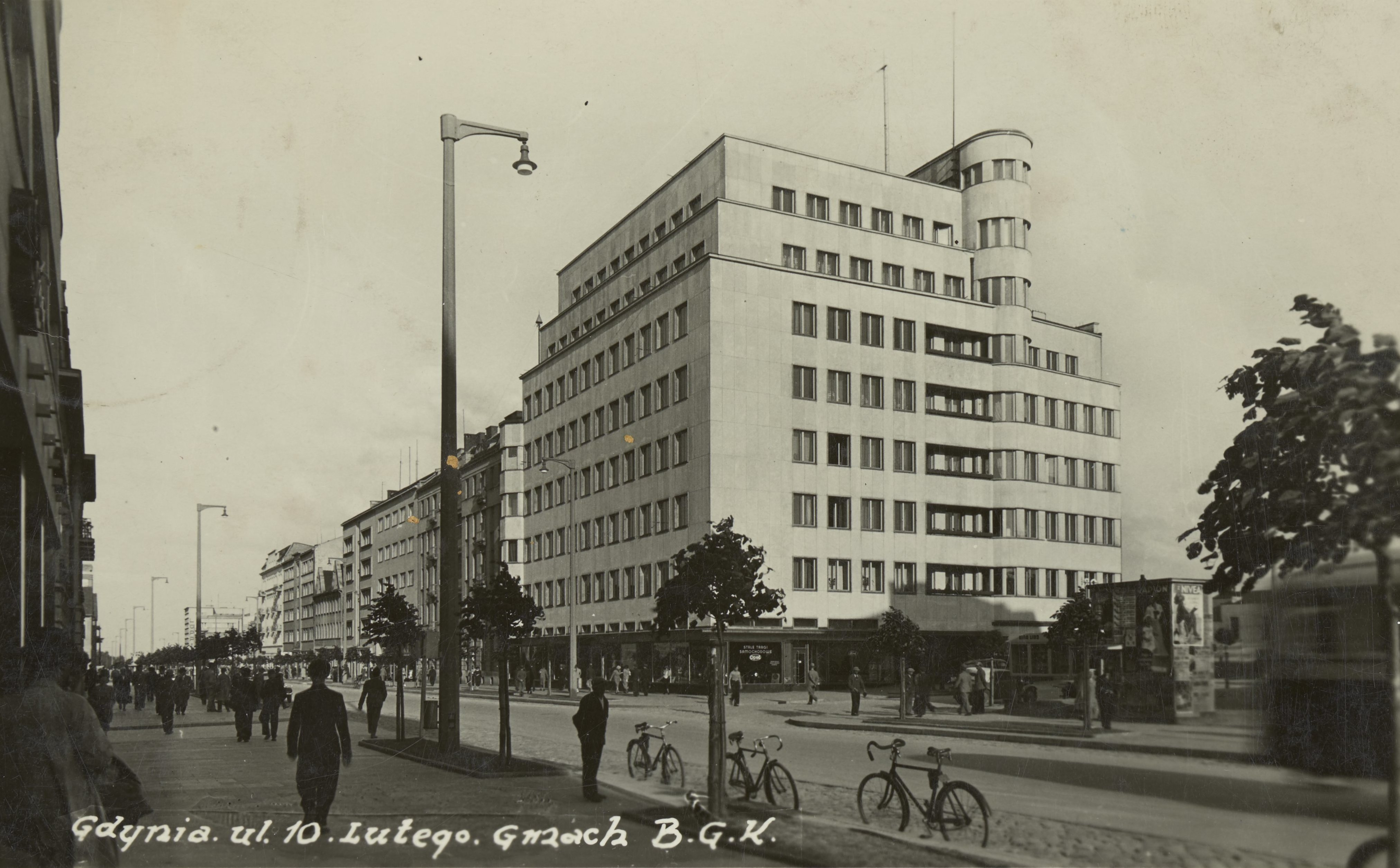
10 Lutego Street, BGK housing complex, 1937–1939

A historical importance of the city formed the basis of an exhibition called Gdynia – Tel Aviv and curated by Dr Artur Tanikowski. It coincided with the centennial of the founding of Gdynia and Bahaus School, 110th anniversary of Tel Aviv. The exhibition explored architectural and cultural links of two ‘white cities’ by the sea, opened at the Polin Museum of Jewish History in 2019 and traveled to the Gdynia City Museum.

Modernism in Europe – Modernism in Gdynia international conference takes place every year since 2007. Gdynia Modernism Trail is created and maintained by the Gdynia Development Agency.

== Notable monuments ==
There are several facilities and institutions in Śródmieście:

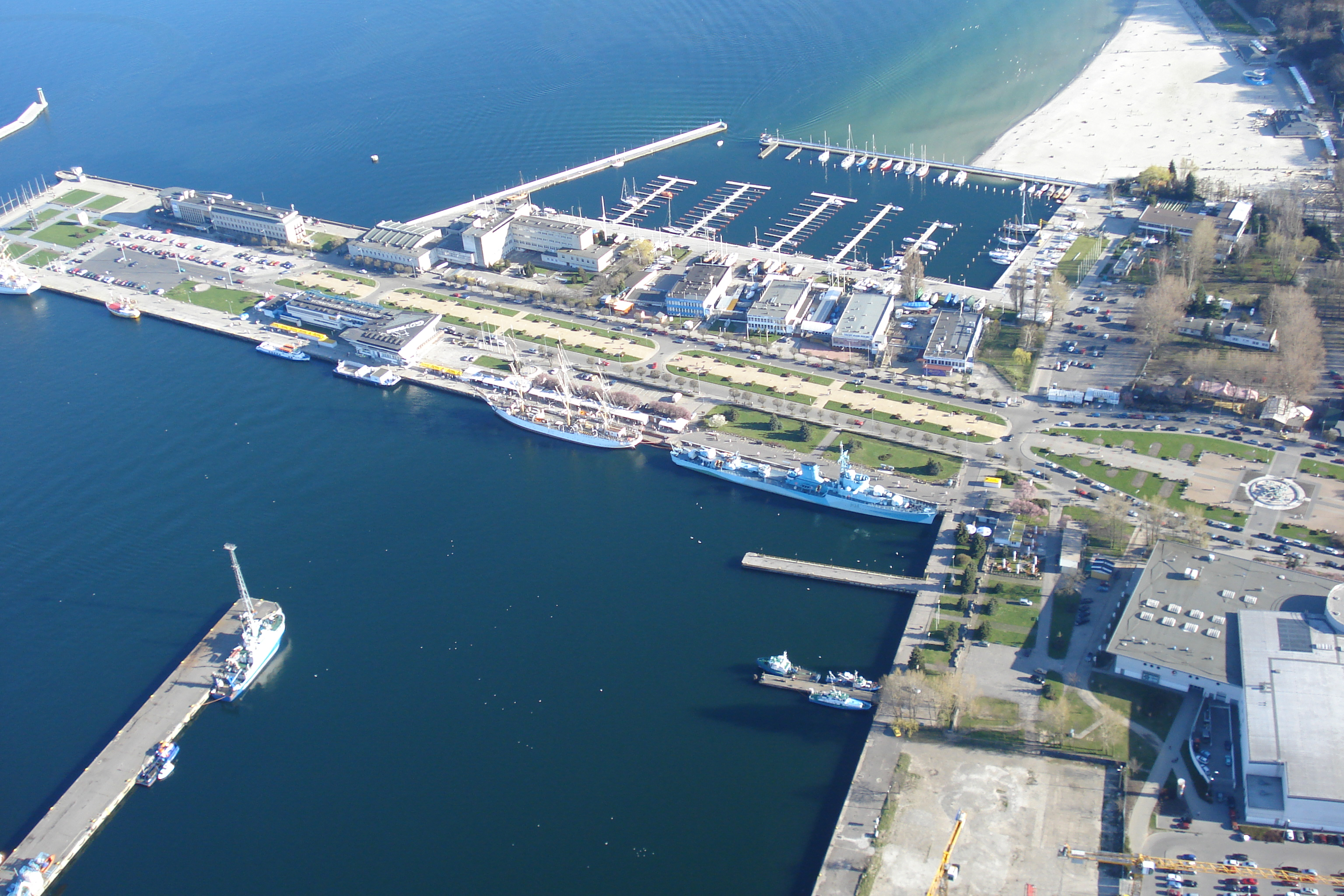
General view of Kościuszko Square and the Southern Pier

- Gdynia City Hall
- Gdynia District Court (Constitution Square 5)
- Gdynia Główna Railway Station (Constitution Square)
- City Market Halls (ul. Wójta Radtkego 36/40)
- Office building of the Social Insurance Institution (former PLO Building, ul. 10 Lutego 24, corner of ul. 3 Maja)
- BGK housing complex (ul. 3 Maja 27-31, corner of ul. 10 Lutego and corner of ul. Batorego)
- Port Construction Office (ul. Washingtona 38)
- Abraham's House (ul. Starowiejska 30)
- House of the Swedish Seaman (ul. Jana z Kolna 25)

=== Gdynia Seaport ===
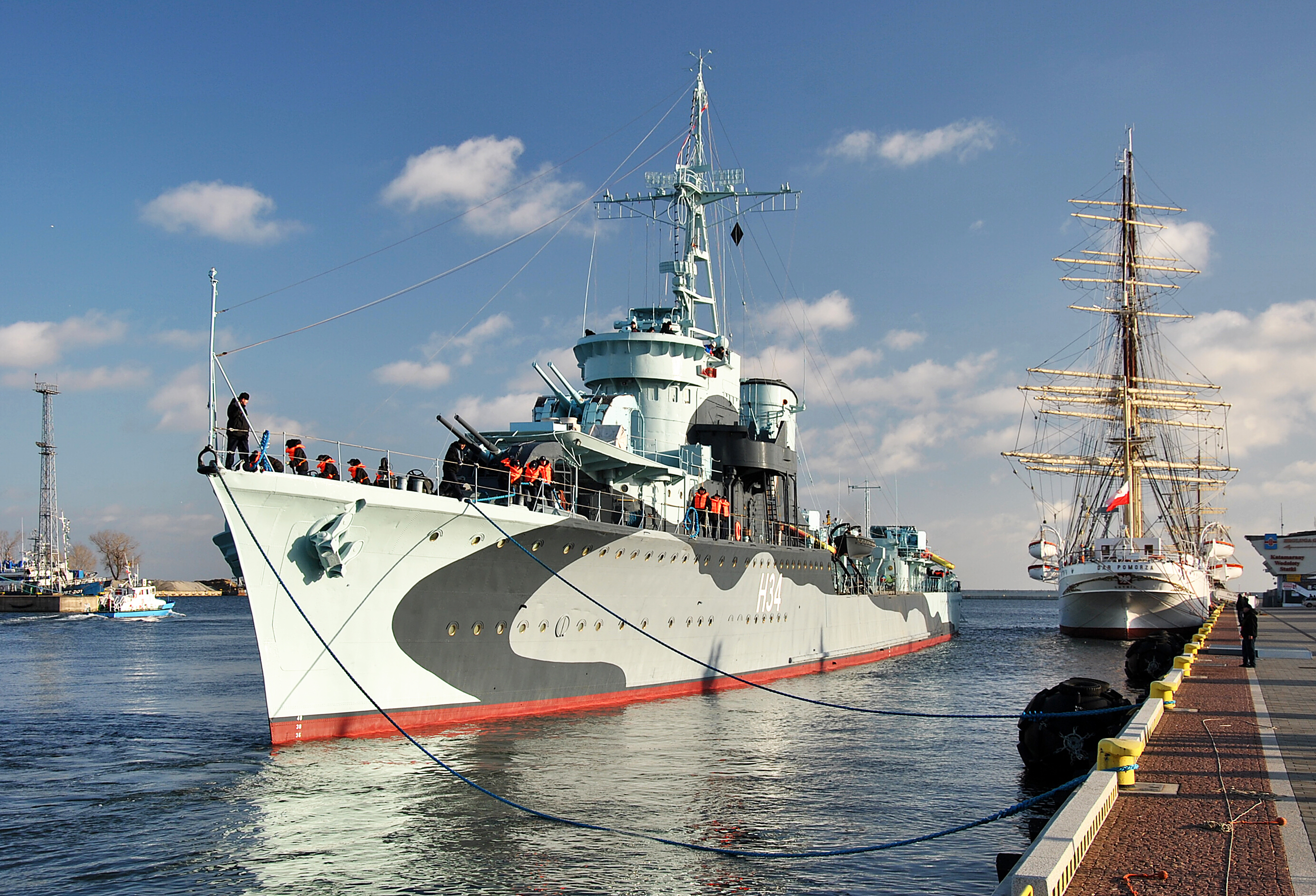
Museum ships ORP Błyskawica and Dar Pomorza

- Marine Station
  - Emigration Museum
- Southern Pier
  - Dar Pomorza
  - ORP Błyskawica
- Gdynia Aquarium
- House of the Polish Sailor

=== Modernist townhouses ===
- Pręczkowski Tenement House (Kościuszko Square 10-12)
- Peszkowski Tenement House (Kościuszko Square 14)
- Krenski House (ul. Świętojańska 55)
- Orłowski House (ul. Świętojańska 68)
- Hundsdorff House (ul. Starowiejska 7)
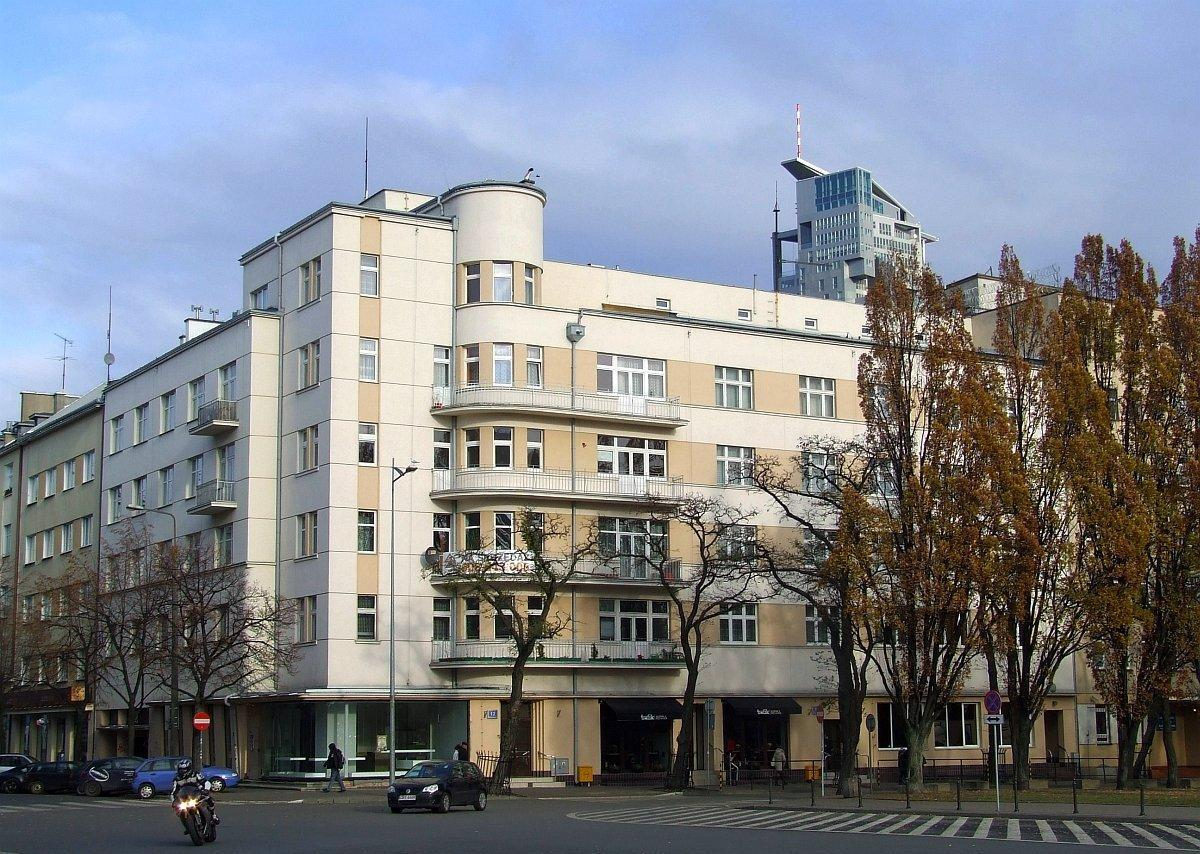
Pręczkowski House

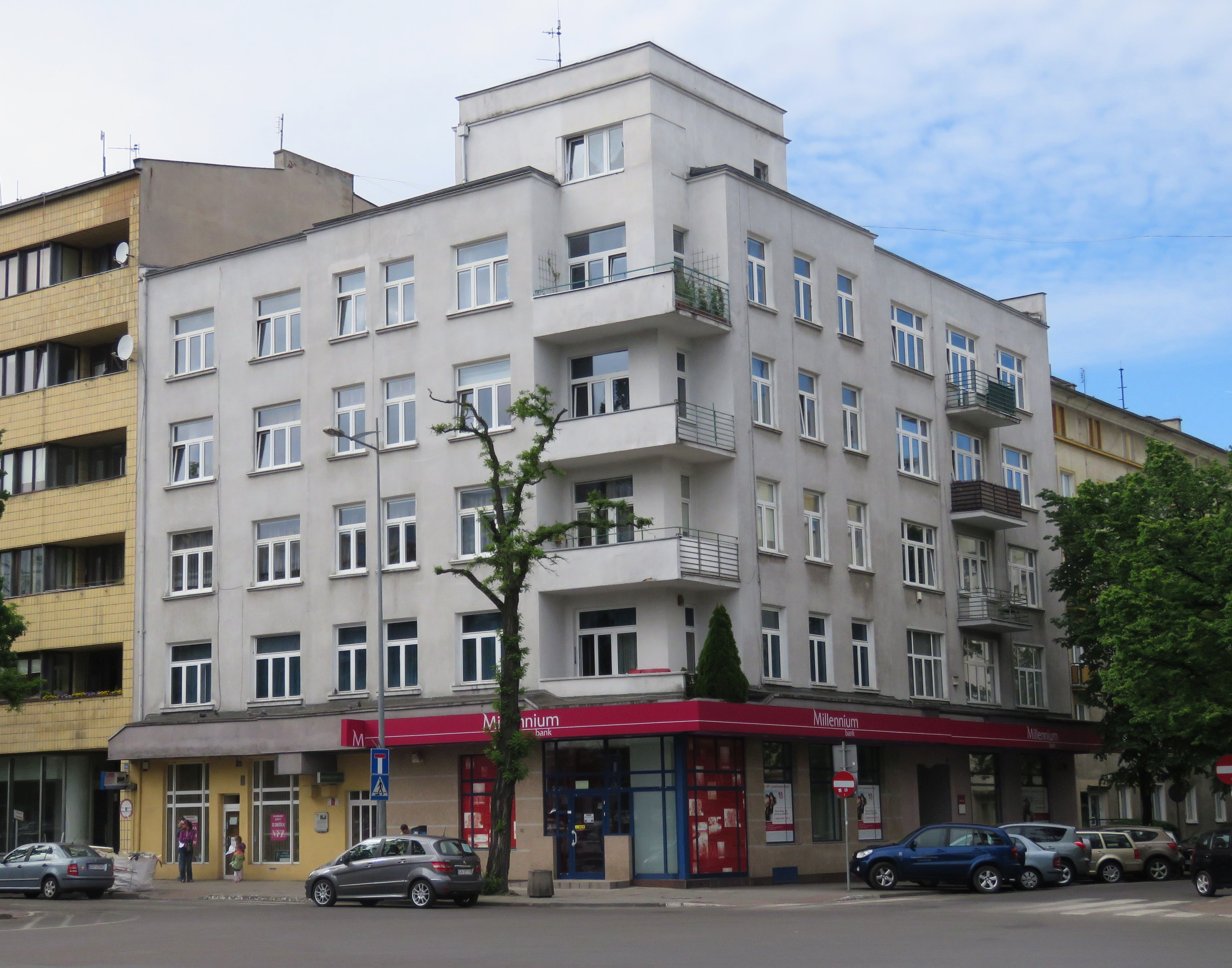
Peszkowski House

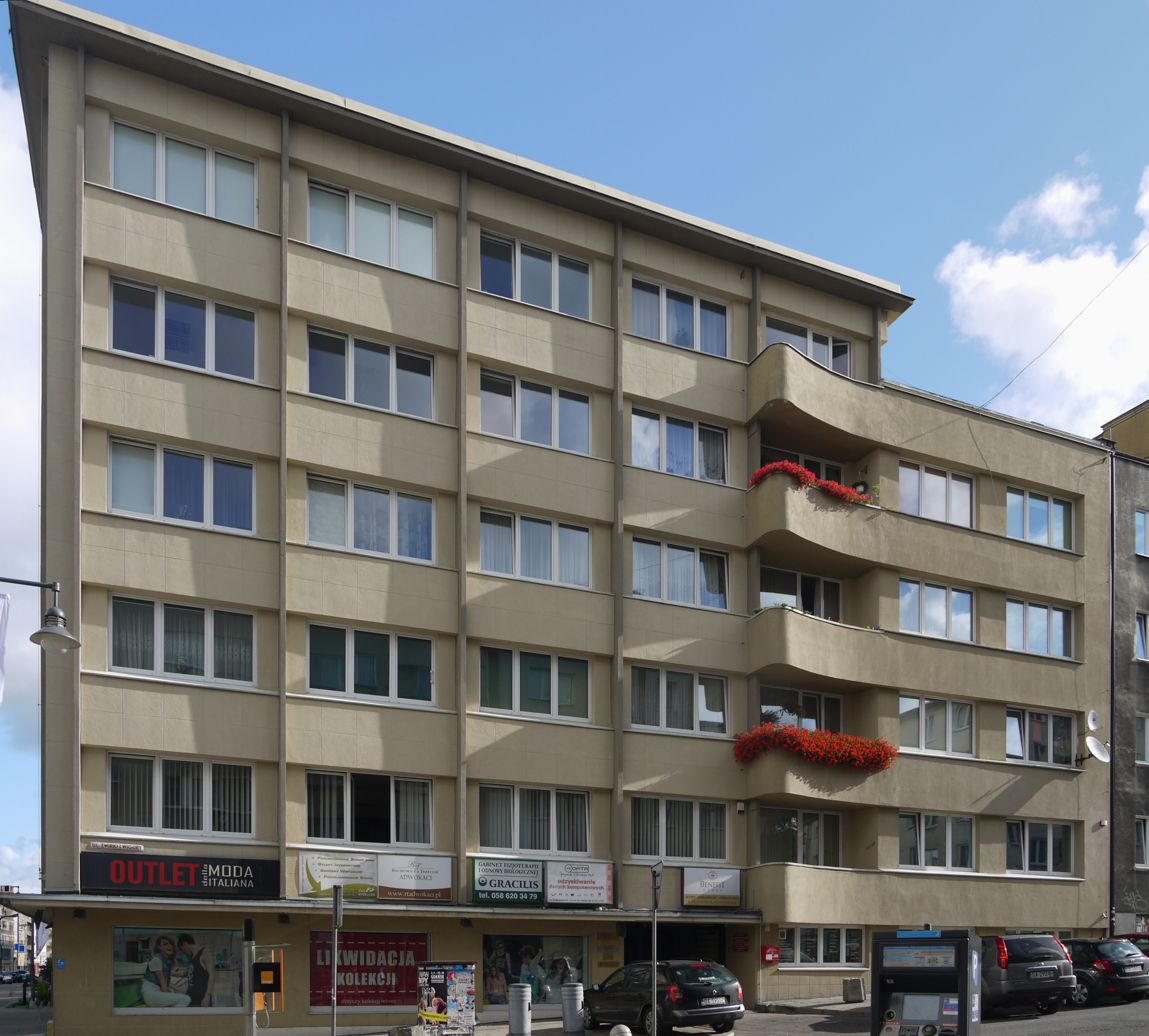
Krenski House

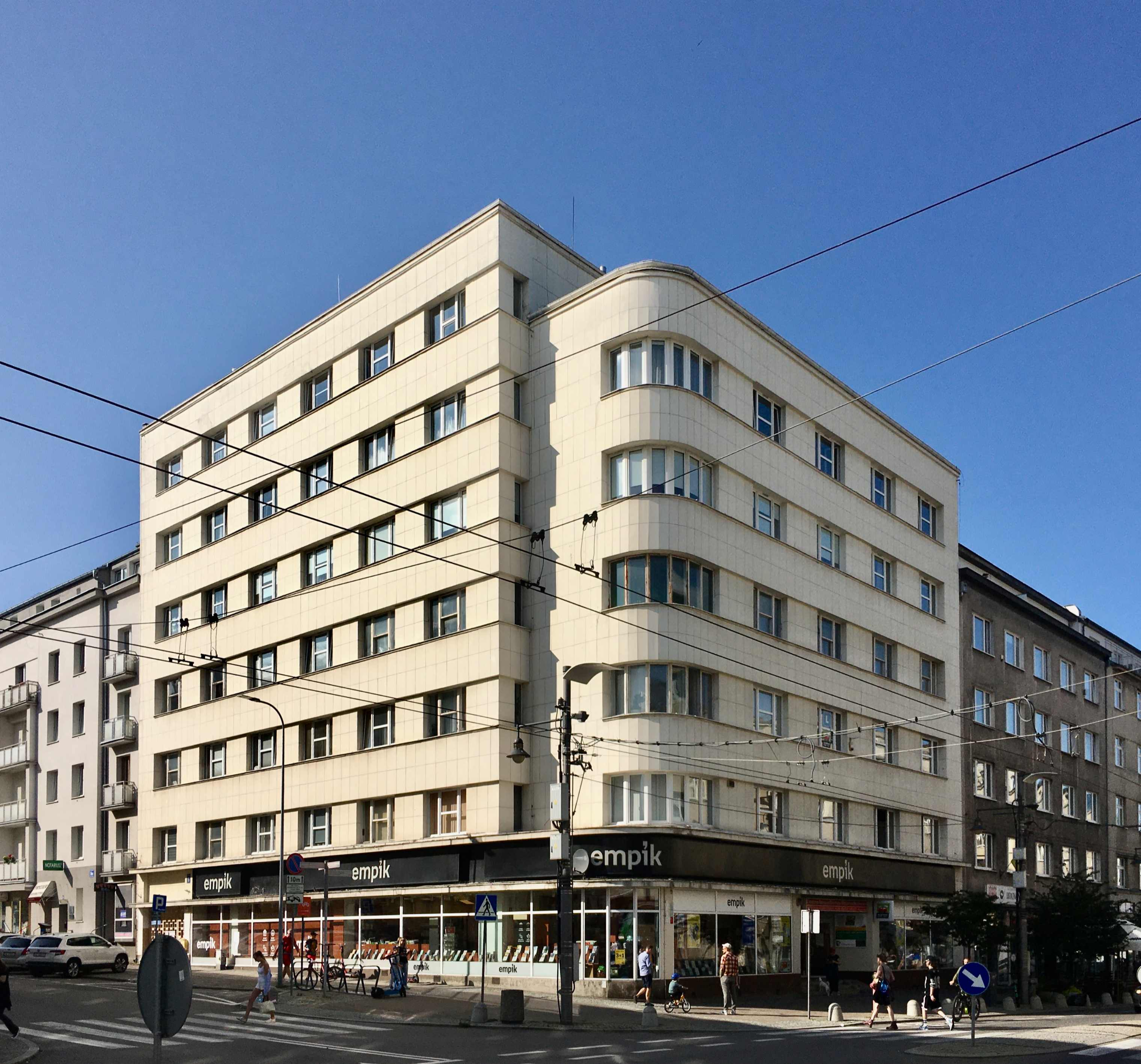
Orłowski House

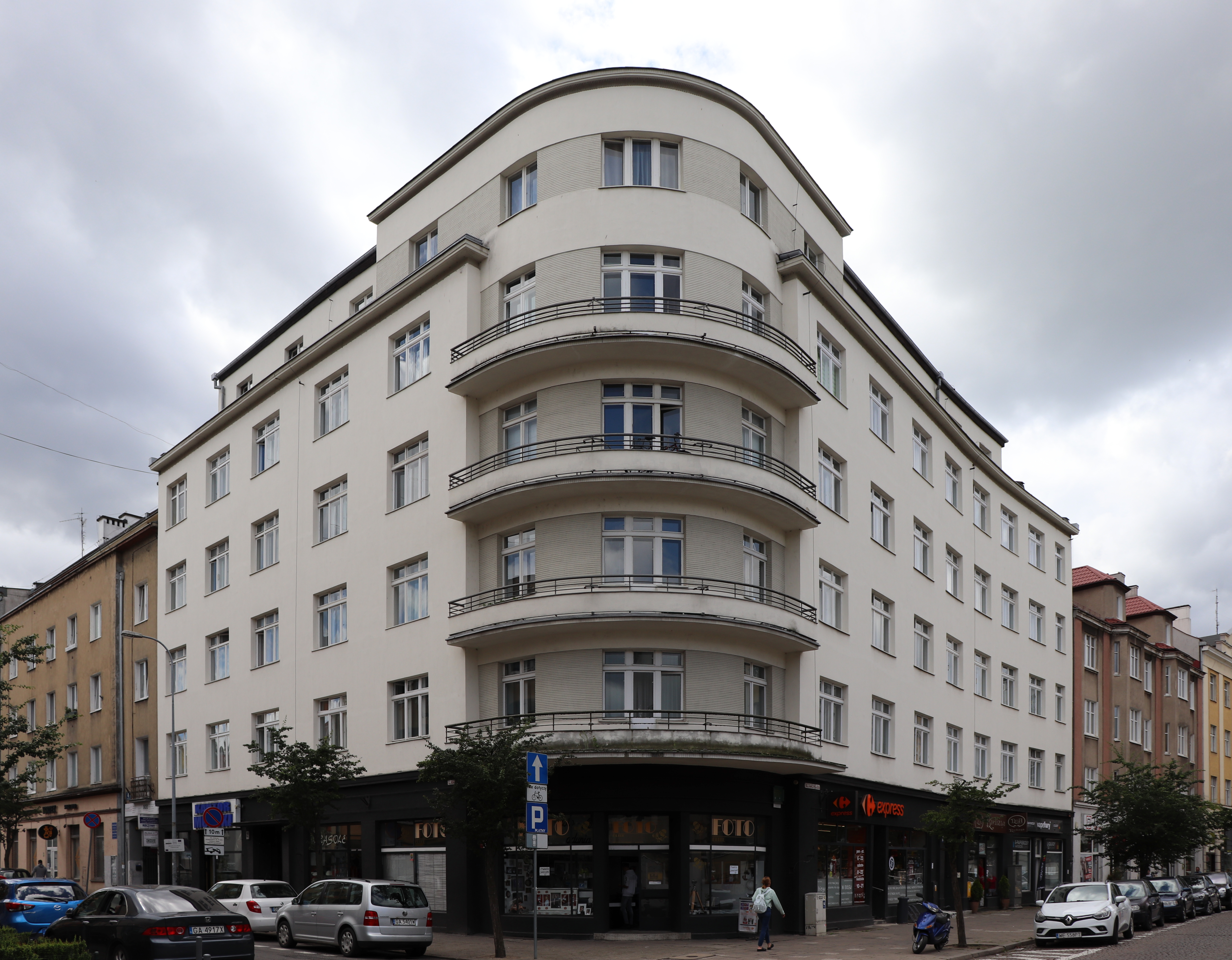
Hundsdorff House

== See also ==
- Geddes Plan for Tel Aviv
- White City of Tel Aviv
- Architecture of Poland
- WUWA, modernist urban area in Wrocław, Poland
