= Falinski =

Falinski is a surname. Notable people with the surname include:

- Ben Falinski (fl. from 2009), British singer and member of the band Ivyrise
- Jason Falinski (born 1970), Australian politician

== See also ==
- Fafinski
- Feliński
