= Feliński =

Feliński is a Polish surname. Notable people with the surname include:

- Alojzy Feliński (1771–1820), Polish writer
- Roman Feliński (1886–1953), Polish architect
- Zygmunt Szczęsny Feliński (1822–1895), Archbishop of Warsaw

== See also ==
- Falinski
