= Gdynia Aquarium =

Public aquarium and sea museum in Poland

- Polish: Akwarium Gdyńskie
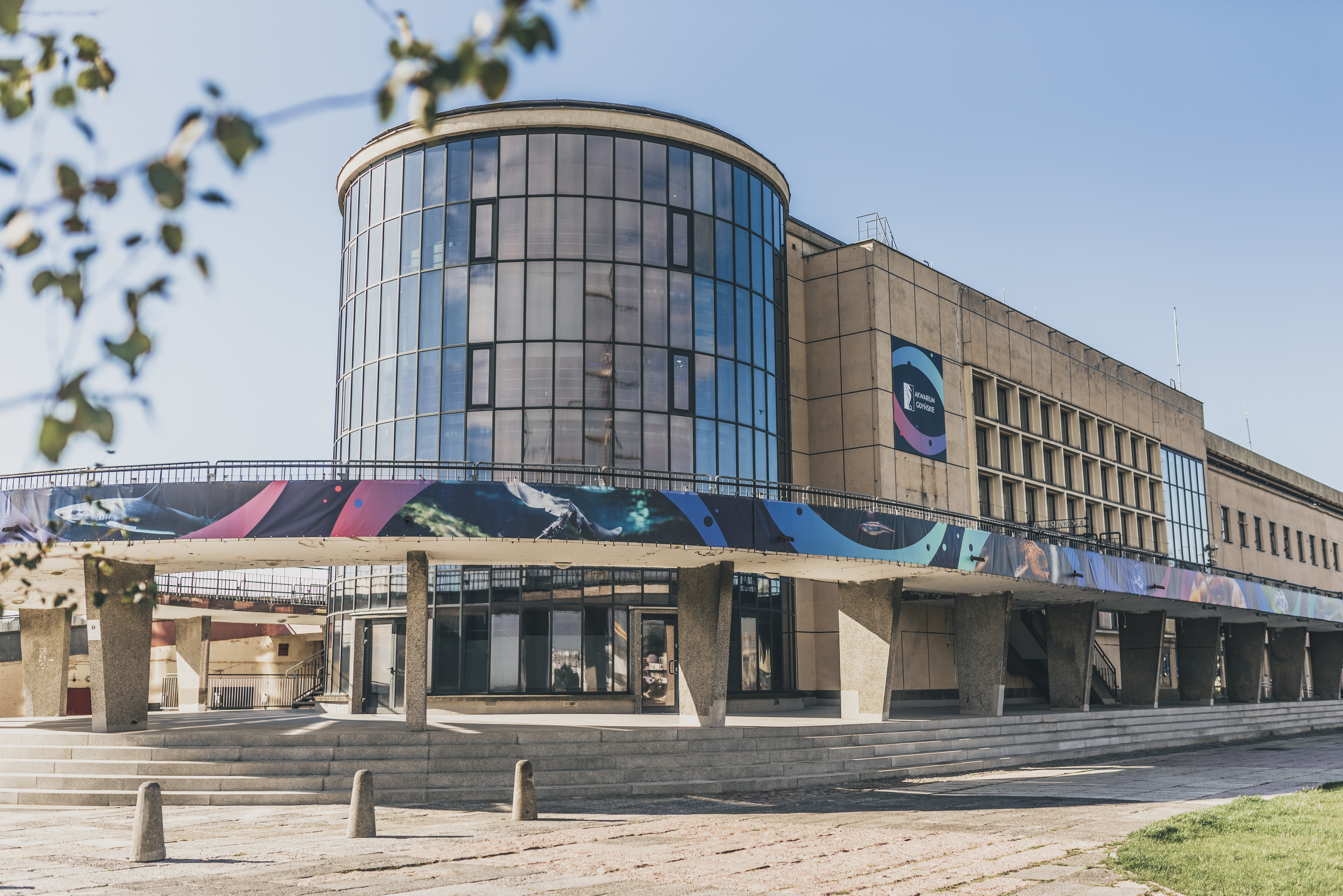
- Museum building
- Interactive map of Gdynia Aquarium
- 54°31′06″N 18°33′27″E
- Date opened: 21 June 1971
- Location: Gdynia, Poland
- Floor space: 1,800 m^{2} (19,000 sq ft)
- No. of species: 250+
- Volume of largest tank: 450,000 L (120,000 US gal)
- Total volume of tanks: 1,050,000 L (280,000 US gal)
- Annual visitors: 400,000
- Owner: National Marine Fisheries Research Institute
- Director: Dr. Piotr Margoński
- Website: Official website

Gdynia Aquarium (Polish: Akwarium Gdyńskie) is a public aquarium and sea museum operated by the National Marine Fisheries Research Institute in Gdynia, Poland. Previously called the Oceanographic Museum and Sea Aquarium of the Sea Fisheries Institute in Gdynia (1971-2003), the aquarium has a zoological garden status and is situated along Aleja John Paul II on the South Pier.

== History ==
The museum has operated since 21 June 1971, although attempts were made to establish it in the 1920s and 1930s. The outbreak of World War II delayed the planned expansion and building of a new exhibit hall until 1971 when construction on the first true expansion started.

== Exhibits ==
Exhibitions presented within the museum are on oceanography and hydrobiology, while the aquarium contains both sea and freshwater flora and fauna.

Educational activities were developed during exhibition modernizations. In 2005, a Cinema-Conference Hall was unveiled, as were rooms equipped with microscopes and computer equipment for conducting laboratory activities. In 2007 a Wet Room was opened - a place where one can put their hands into an open-top aquarium tank and touch fish. The Marine Education Section was expanded with a Preschool Room full of soft marine toys, which is very frequently visited by the youngest school children.

In 2019, an expansion of the educational path in Gdynia Aquarium and the addition of a new exhibit called “Cold Seas – from the Atlantic to the Baltic” was announced. It includes 12 new aquariums with a total volume of 450,000 litres (120,000 US gal) and more than 30 Atlantic animal species, including Atlantic nettle jellyfish, lumpfish, garfish, sharks, rays, lobsters and European flounder. The expanded exhibit opened in 2024.
