= Fafinski =

Fafinski is a Polish surname.

== People ==
- Jacek Fafiński, Olympic silver medalist during the 1996 Summer Olympics in Atlanta
- Dr Stefan Fafinski DL, Master of the Worshipful Company of Information Technologists for 2017-18, Deputy Lieutenant for the Royal County of Berkshire
