= Roman Feliński =

Polish architect

Roman Feliński (4 February 1886 – 22 March 1953) was a Polish architect. He authored the first Polish book on urban planning. He worked on development plans for Gdynia and Warsaw, and designed over 150 buildings, among others, the Magnus Department Store and a dozen or so tenement houses in Lviv.
