= List of standardized tests in the United States =

A standardized test is a test administered and scored in a standard manner. The following are such tests as administered across the United States.

== Ability/Achievement tests ==
Ability/ Achievement tests are used to evaluate a student's or worker's understanding, comprehension, knowledge and/or capability in a particular area. They are used in academics, professions and many other areas.

A general distinction is usually made between tests of ability/ aptitude (intelligence tests) versus tests of achievement (academic proficiency).

=== IQ tests ===
- Stanford–Binet Intelligence Scales (SB5)
- Wechsler Adult Intelligence Scale (WAIS)
- Wechsler Intelligence Scale for Children (WISC)
- Wechsler Preschool and Primary Scale of Intelligence (WPPSI)
- Otis–Lennon School Ability Test
- Differential Ability Scales (DAS)
- Woodcock–Johnson Tests of Cognitive Abilities (WJ)

=== Achievement tests ===
- Wechsler Individual Achievement Test (WIAT)
- Kaufman Test of Educational Achievement (KTEA)
- Woodcock–Johnson Tests of Achievement (WJ)
- Peabody Individual Achievement Test (PIAT-R)
- Wide Range Achievement Test, 5th Ed. (WRAT-5)

=== Public schools ===
- National Assessment of Educational Progress (NAEP)
- State achievement tests are standardized tests. These may be required in American public schools for the schools to receive federal funding, according to the US Public Law 107-110 originally passed as Elementary and Secondary Education Act of 1965, and currently authorized as Every Student Succeeds Act in 2015. No Child Left Behind was the controversial version of the law signed by President G. W. Bush in 2001; it was reauthorized in 2015 by President B. Obama.
- Exit examinations for high school graduation

=== Other tests ===
The test of General Educational Development (GED) and Test Assessing Secondary Completion TASC evaluate whether a person who has not received a high school diploma has academic skills at the level of a high school graduate.

Private tests are tests created by private institutions for various purposes, such as progress monitoring in K-12 classrooms.

- ACT
  - PLAN
  - EXPLORE
  - WorkKeys
- California Achievement Test
- ITBS – Iowa Test of Basic Skills
- SAT – formerly Scholastic Aptitude Test
  - SAT Subject Tests
- CLT – Classic Learning Test
- Former English Language Proficiency Test – ELPT
- PSAT/NMSQT – Preliminary SAT/National Merit Scholarship Qualifying Test
- STAR Early Literacy, STAR Math, and STAR Reading
- Stanford Achievement Test
- TerraNova

== Admissions tests ==
Admissions tests are used in the admission process at elite or private elementary and secondary schools, as well as most colleges and universities. They are generally used to predict the likelihood of a student's success in an academic setting.

=== Secondary school ===
- ISEE – Independent School Entrance Examination
- SSAT – Secondary School Admission Test
- HSPT – High School Placement Test
- COOP – Cooperative admissions examination program
- SHSAT – Specialized High School Admissions Test

=== Undergraduate ===
- SAT – formerly Scholastic Aptitude Test
  - SAT Subject Tests
  - Former English Language Proficiency Test – ELPT
- ACT – formerly American College Testing Program or American College Test
- ACCUPLACER – community colleges and 4 year colleges placement test
- CLT – Classic Learning Test

=== Graduate/professional schools ===
- Dental Admission Test (DAT) – (United States)
- Graduate Management Admission Test (GMAT) – (US)
- Graduate Record Examination (GRE) – (US and Canada)
- Law School Admission Test (LSAT) – (US and Canada)
- Miller Analogies Test (MAT)
- Medical College Admission Test (MCAT) – (US and Canada)
- Optometry Admission Test (OAT) – Optometry Admission Test
- Pharmacy College Admission Test (PCAT) - no longer administered
- Veterinary College Admission Test (VCAT) – no longer administered; American veterinary schools now use either the GRE or MCAT
- California Basic Educational Skills Test
- Wiesen Test of Mechanical Aptitude (WTMA)

== Language proficiency ==
- TOEIC – Test of English for International Communication
- TOEFL – Test of English as a Foreign Language
- IELTS – International English Language Testing System

== Psychological tests ==
- 16 Personality Factors
- Beck Depression Inventory
- Millon Clinical Multiaxial Inventory
- Minnesota Multiphasic Personality Inventory (MMPI)
- Personality Assessment Inventory
- Myers–Briggs Type Indicator (MBTI)
- Revised NEO Personality Inventory
- Thematic Apperception Test

== Professional certification tests ==
- Certified Public Accountant (CPA) for Accountants
- Chartered Financial Analyst (CFA)
- COMLEX-USA for osteopathic physicians
- Examination for Professional Practice in Psychology (EPPP), the most common certification for practitioners of Clinical Psychology in the U.S.
- Fundamentals of Engineering (FE), the first of two exams that must be passed to become a Professional Engineer
- General Securities Representative Examination, more commonly known as the Series 7 Exam, required to receive a license as a stockbroker in the U.S.
- Investment Company Products/Variable Life Contracts Representative Examination, more commonly known as the Series 6 Exam, for U.S. licensing to sell a limited set of securities such as mutual funds and variable life insurance
- Multistate Bar Examination (MBE), part of the bar examination in almost all United States jurisdictions
- Multistate Pharmacy Jurisprudence Examination (MPJE), a prerequisite for licensure as a pharmacist in the vast majority of U.S. jurisdictions
- Multistate Professional Responsibility Examination (MPRE), a requirement for bar admission in addition to the bar examination in almost all U.S. jurisdictions
- NAPLEX, required by all U.S. jurisdictions for licensure as a pharmacist
- NCLEX-PN for Licensed Practical Nurses
- NCLEX-RN for Registered Nurses
- Physician Assistant National Certifying Exam for physician assistants (PA)
- PRAXIS for Teacher certification
- Principles and Practice of Engineering Exam the second of the two exams someone must pass to become a Professional Engineer
- Uniform Certified Public Accountant Examination
- Uniform Combined State Law Examination, more commonly called the Series 66 Exam, required by some U.S. states for state certification as both a securities agent and investment adviser representative
- Uniform Securities Agent State Law Examination, more commonly known as the Series 63 Exam, required by almost all U.S. states for state certification as a securities agent
- United States Medical Licensing Examination for physicians (holders of either Doctor of Medicine or Doctor of Osteopathic Medicine degrees)
- USPTO registration examination, a requirement of the United States Patent and Trademark Office for registration as a patent attorney or agent

== Armed Forces ==
ASVAB (United States) required for entry into any branch of The United States Military. Other tests, such as AFOQT and ASTB are used for officers.

== See also ==
- List of admissions tests
- Standards-based assessment
