= List of admission tests to colleges and universities =

This is a list of standardized tests that students may need to take for admissions to various colleges or universities. Tests of language proficiency are excluded here.

Only tests not included within a certain secondary schooling curriculum are listed. Therefore, those tests initially focused on secondary–school–leaving, e.g., GCE A–Levels in the UK, Abitur in Germany or French Baccalaureate, are not listed here, although they function as the de facto admission tests in those countries (see list of secondary school leaving certificates).

== Undergraduate ==
=== Albania ===
- Matura Shtetërore – Required for entry to some Albanian universities.

=== Australia ===
- ATAR – Australian Tertiary Admission Rank, indicative rank for school leavers, replacing UAI, ENTE and TER and OP. Different states and territories have different external standardised tests.
  - New South Wales: Higher School Certificate (HSC)
  - Victoria: Victorian Certificate of Education (VCE)
  - Queensland: Queensland Certificate of Education (QCE), Queensland Certificate of Individual Achievement (QCIA)
  - South Australia: South Australian Certificate of Education (SACE)
  - Western Australia: Western Australian Certificate of Education (WACE)
  - Tasmania: Tasmanian Certificate of Education (TCE)
  - ACT: No external standardised exams
  - Northern Territory: Northern Territory Certificate of Education and Training (NTCET)
- STAT – Special Tertiary Admissions Test, aptitude test for non–school leavers.
- UCAT – University Clinical Aptitude Test, required for undergraduate entry to many Australian and New Zealand undergraduate-entry medical and dental schools.
- GAMSAT – Graduate Australian Medical School Admissions Test, required for graduate entry to many Australian graduate–entry medical and dental schools.
- International Student Admissions Test

=== Bangladesh ===
Admission processes vary depending on universities. From 2020-2021 onward, most public universities offer central admission tests. However, some public universities including University of Dhaka, University of Rajshahi, University of Chittagong, Jahangirnagar University, Jagannath University, Khulna University, Bangladesh University of Professionals, Comilla University, Bangladesh University of Engineering and Technology, Khulna University of Engineering and Technology, Chittagong University of Engineering and Technology, Rajshahi University of Engineering and Technology, Shahjalal University of Science and Technology and Hajee Mohammad Danesh Science & Technology University present their own individual admission tests from 2024-2025 onward. All private universities in the country offer their own individual admission tests.

There are also three central admissions exams:

- GST Admission System or Guccha – The central and combined undergraduate program admission test for 19 public general, science and technological universities. There are 08 general universities and 11 science and technology universities from 2025 GST admission test.
- ACAS – The combined admission test for 8 agricultural universities along with the Chittagong Veterinary and Animal Sciences University and Patuakhali Science and Technology University's Faculty of Agriculture's undergraduate program.
- Admission Test for 1st Year MBBS or Medical College's Admission Test – The undergraduate level medical admission test for MBBS program that includes all state owned and private medical colleges.

=== Belize ===
- Caribbean Examinations Council.

=== Brazil ===
- Vestibular – Single University entrance exam in Brazil, each University may have its own vestibular.
- Exame Nacional do Ensino Médio

=== Canada ===
- GED – High School Diploma Equivalent
- CAEL – Canadian Academic English Language Assessment
- Diploma Exams — Only taken in Alberta

=== Chile ===
- Prueba de Acceso a la Educación Superior (PAES) from 2022 (formerly PDT and PSU)

=== China ===
- Gaokao – Standard means of entry to Chinese universities.

=== Colombia ===
- SABER 11 Exam – Test for all undergraduate students that want to apply to a university in Colombian territory.

=== Cuba ===
- Prueba de Ingreso a la Universidad – Set of exams in different subject matters for all students who want to enter any university in Cuba.

=== France ===
- Baccalauréat (or Bac) – Test for all undergraduate students who are looking to enter a university in France.

=== Germany ===
- TMS – Test for Medical Studies, used by most medical colleges in Germany.
- PhaST – Pharmaceutical Studies Aptitude Test, used for most pharmaceutical study programmes.
- HAM-Nat – Hamburg test for natural sciences, used by two universities for medical studies and pharmaceutical studies.
- BaPsy-DGPs - Studieneignungstest Deutsche Gesellschaft für Psychologie, test for study programmes in psychology.
- ITB-Business – Test for business administration and social sciences, used by some universities for business administration studies.
- ITB-Science – Test for STEM studies, used by some universities in Germany, Switzerland and Austria for admission procedures.
- ITB-Technology – Test for engineering, mathematics and computer science.

=== Greece ===
- Panhellenic Examinations – Subject tests for Greek students and adults who want to enter High Education Institutions (HEIs).

=== Ghana ===
CDSU-IALE: INTERNATIONAL DIPLOMATIC EXAM (Level: 1, 2, 3, And 4)

- Consular & Diplomatic Service University (CDSU)
- CDSU - IALE (International Licensure Examinations for Ambassadors and Career Diplomats)

=== Hong Kong ===
Admission processes differ in institutes. For secondary school students applying for degree–level programmes provided by the University Grants Committee (UGC)–funded institutes, they can only apply through the Joint University Programmes Admissions System (JUPAS), which uses Hong Kong Advanced Level Examination (HKALE) and Hong Kong Certificate of Education Examination (HKCEE) as benchmark agency until academic year 2011/12, and Hong Kong Diploma of Secondary Education (HKDSE) since 2011/12.

JUPAS is not used in most non-UGC/non–degree level programmes, even these institutes still use the examination results that JUPAS uses as benchmark agency.

- Hong Kong Certificate of Education Examination (Last year of exam in 2011, as EAS Subsystem of JUPAS until 2011).
- Hong Kong Advanced Level Examination (Last year of exam in 2013, as JUPAS benchmark until 2012 admission).
- Hong Kong Diploma of Secondary Education (The new qualification to replace the two qualifications above, starts since 2011/12).

=== Hungary ===
Érettségi (Matura)is the national school leaving exam, where school leavers take exams in 5 or more subjects, among which Hungarian Grammar and Literature, Maths, History and one foreign language is compulsory and at least 1 other subject has to be chosen.

Érettségi is divided into 2 levels. Most universities require at least one subject to be taken at Higher Level. From 2020 onward, students wishing to enter into higher education were required to have 1 subject taken at Higher Level.

=== India ===
Admission procedures and entry tests vary widely across states and universities/institutes. Usually, admission to a university in a state is based upon the performance of the candidates in the statewide Higher Secondary Examinations. These are usually given after completion of the twelfth standard/grade, for example, the HSC examinations of Maharashtra. Admission into federally established institutes like the Indian Institutes of Technology and the National Institutes of Technology is usually based on a combination of performance in nationwide exams such as the Joint Entrance Examination and the state–level Higher Secondary examinations. Admission to the National Law Universities is based on a national level entrance examination conducted annually by the CLAT.

==== National level ====
===== Professional courses entrance examinations =====
- Joint Entrance Examination – Main – For entry in National Institutes of Technology, Government Funded Technical Institutes, Indian Institutes of Information Technology & Indian Institutes of Engineering Science and Technology to pursue various undergraduate engineering, technical and architecture courses.
- Joint Entrance Examination – Advanced – For entry in Indian Institutes of Technology to pursue various undergraduate engineering, technical and architecture courses.
- Common Law Admission Test (CLAT) – Standard means of entry to the National Law Universities across India.
- National Eligibility cum Entrance Test (Undergraduate) (NEET (UG)) – For entry in to undergraduate medical education (MBBS), dental (BDS) and AYUSH courses. The test is conducted at all-India level.
- Common University Entrance Test (CUET) – For entry into the 45 Central Universities of India.
- CA Foundation Course – Entrance level test for the chartered accountancy course offered by the Institute of Chartered Accountants of India (ICAI).
- IISER Aptitude Test (IAT) – Entrance test for undergraduate admissions at the IISERs.

=== Indonesia ===
State-level:

- SNBT – (Seleksi Nasional Berdasarkan Tes) – A competitive test for undergraduate admissions in public universities in Indonesia.
- SNBP – (Seleksi Nasional Berdasarkan Prestasi)

Conducted jointly by some universities:

- UMB – (Ujian Masuk Bersama) – Test for undergraduate admissions in some state and private colleges.
- SBM–PTAIN – Test for entering public Islamic universities in Indonesia.
- SBMPTMU – Test for entering Muhammadiyah universities.

Conducted by individual universities:

- SIMAK UI – University of Indonesia entrance exam.
- UTUL UGM – Gadjah Mada University entrance exam.

=== Israel ===
- Psychometric Entrance Test (colloquially "The Psychometry") – Required for undergraduate entry to most universities in Israel.

=== Iran ===
- Iranian University Entrance Exam (Konkoor/Concours) – Standard means of entry to universities in Iran.

=== Ireland ===
- Health Professions Admissions Test (HPAT) – Undergraduate Medical Admissions Test, required for undergraduate entry to Irish Medical Schools.

=== Japan ===
- National Center Test for University Admissions
- Examination for Japanese University Admission (EJU) – Required for entry by foreigners into many Japanese universities.
- Japan University Examination (JPUE) – An alternative to EJU.

=== Malaysia ===
- Sijil Pelajaran Malaysia, also known as Malaysia Certificate of Education.
- Sijil Tinggi Persekolahan Malaysia, also known as Malaysia Higher School Certificate.

=== Mexico ===
Each University in Mexico has its own admission procedure. Some of them might use the EXANI–I from Centro Nacional de Evaluación para la Educación Superior "CENEVAL" (National Center for Higher Education Assessment). Many also use the Prueba de Aptitud Académica offered by the College Board Puerto Rico y America Latina. However, due to the autonomous nature of most universities in Mexico, many universities use admissions tests that they develop themselves.

- "Examen de admisión al Nivel Superior del Instituto Politécnico Nacional" (Admission Exam to the Higher Level of the National Polytechnic Institute).
- "Examen Nacional de Ingreso a la Educación Media Superior" (National Entrance Exam to the Upper–Intermediate Education) also known as EXANI–I.
- "Acuerdo 286 Bachillerato" (286 Baccalaureate Agreement), also known as ACREDITA–BACH. High School Diploma Equivalent.
- "Examen General de Egreso de la Licenciatura" (General Egress Exam of the bachelor's degree). also known as EGEL.
- "Examen para Profesionales Técnicos en Enfermería" (Exam for Nursing Technical Professionals), also known as EGEPT–ENFER.
- "Examen General de Conocimientos y Habilidades para la Acreditación de la Licenciatura en Enseñanza del Inglés" (General Knowledge and Skills Test for the Accreditation of the English Teaching bachelor's degree), also known as EGAL–EIN.

=== Myanmar ===
- Matriculation Examination (တက္ကသိုလ်ဝင်စာမေးပွဲ, lit. 'University Entrance Examination'), formerly titled Basic Education High School Examination (အခြေခံပညာအထက်တန်းစာမေးပွဲ).

=== Nepal ===
Common Management Admission Test (CMAT) – a standardized test taken by colleges to take admissions for BBA and BBM.

Medical Education Common Entrance Examination (MECEE) – a common entrance examination conducted in Nepal for providing admission in Medical UG and PG courses.

=== Netherlands ===
- Eindexamen – also known as centraal examen (central exam) – a standardized test taken by Dutch students in conclusion of their high school education (voortgezet onderwijs; "continued education").

=== Nigeria ===
- Unified Tertiary Matriculation Examination (UTME) – Mandatory computer–based test for all candidates (including non-Nigerians) applying to study into any Nigerian university. It is administered by the Joint Admissions and Matriculation Board.

=== Pakistan ===
- NAT-I/II – National Aptitude Test, for admission in most universities and colleges of Pakistan.

It is conducted by the National Testing Service.

- NMDCAT– National Medical and Dental College Admission Test, for admission in public and private sector medical and dental colleges and universities in Pakistan.

It is conducted by the Pakistan Medical Commission through National Testing Service.

- ECAT – Engineering College Admission Test, for admission in public sector engineering college or university in Punjab, Pakistan.

It is conducted by the University of Engineering and Technology, Lahore.

- ETEA (UET) - for admission in public sector engineering college or university in Khyber Pakhtunkhwa.

It is conducted by University of Engineering and Technology, Peshawar.

- HAT-UG – HEC Aptitude Test-Undergraduate, for admission in selected government and private colleges and universities.
- LAT – HEC Law admission Test, for LLB admission in all colleges and universities.

It is conducted by the Higher Education Commission of Pakistan.

- Pre-Admission Tests - for admission in engineering universities of Sindh such as MUET and NED.

The tests are conducted separately by the respective universities.

=== Philippines ===
Until its abolition in 1994, the National College Entrance Examination (NCEE) served as a standardized test for university admissions. As of 2024, each university runs their own entrance exams, such as the University of the Philippines College Admission Test (UPCAT).

=== Poland ===
Universities and other institutions of higher education formerly ran their own entrance exams. Since the introduction of the "new matura" in 2005, and in particular the marking of that exam by independent examiners rather than by teachers at students' own schools, the matura now serves as the admission test for Polish students.

=== Russia ===
- Unified State Exam (Russian: Единый государственный экзамен, ЕГЭ, romanized: Yediniy gosudarstvenniy ekzamen, EGE) – every student must pass after graduation from school to enter a university or a professional college. Since 2009, EGE is the only form of graduation examinations in schools and the main form of preliminary examinations in universities.
- Unified Republic Exam (Russian: Единый республиканский экзамен, ЕРЭ, romanized: Yediniy respublikanskiy ekzamen, ERE; Tatar: Бердәм Республика Имтиханы, БРИ, Berdäm Respublika Imtixanı, BRI) – students which graduate in the Republic of Tatarstan can choose to pass the ERE/BRI in the Tatar language. The test is not obligatory and accepted as an entry exam only by the Tatarstan universities, especially for the Tatar language faculties.

=== Saudi Arabia ===
- Qudurat and Tahseeli – by The National Center for Assessment in Higher Education AKA Qiyas.

=== Singapore ===
- Singapore–Cambridge GCE Advanced Level

=== Spain ===
- Pruebas de Acceso a Estudios Universitarios – Formerly called "Selectividad".

=== Sri Lanka ===
- GCE Advanced Level in Sri Lanka

In Sri Lanka, A-Level is offered by governmental and non-governmental schools. The qualifications are awarded upon successful completion of examinations called Local A-Levels while most of the private schools award them upon London A-Levels. Local GCE Advanced Level qualification is offered by the Department of Examinations. Passing A-Levels is the major requirement for applying for local universities. This exam is very competitive, where students have to study college 1st-year and 2nd-year material and pass it to get college admissions. The tough nature of the examination is due to the government funding all the college students. Students who get in to a National University through the Advanced Level Examination are not required to pay college fees.

=== Sweden ===
- Högskoleprovet – the Swedish Scholastic Aptitude Test.
- PIL – Test and interview, used by the Karolinska Institute for admission to some of its study programs.
- Matematik och Fysikprovet - Test used by several universities for admission to some engineering, math and physics related programs.

=== Switzerland ===
- EMS Swiss Admission Test for Medicine (Eignungstest für das Medizinstudium in der Schweiz).

=== Somalia ===
- Certification Exams - (Somali: Imtixaanka Shahaadiga) Standard means of entry to Somali universities.

=== South Korea ===
- College Scholastic Ability Test – Standard means of entry to South Korean universities and colleges.

=== Taiwan ===
- General Scholastic Ability Test – Standard means of entry to Taiwanese universities and colleges held in January. It consists of five subjects, namely Chinese, English, Mathematics, Social Studies and Science. Examinees should take at least four subjects at a time (of course they can choose the whole set.)
- Advanced Subjects Test – Standard means of entry to Taiwanese universities and colleges held in July. The AST was first administered in 2002, and phased out after 2021. It consisted of ten subjects, namely Chinese, English, Mathematics (A and B), History, Geography, Citizen and Society, Physics, Chemistry, and Biology. Examinees could take the subject tests that were required to meet a university's standard.

=== Thailand ===
- TGAT - Thai General Aptitude Test. It is an aptitude test aimed to test the basic or general abilities of a student such as English communication, and logical thinking.
- TPAT - Thai Professional Aptitude Tests. TPAT are aptitude tests required by universities for students applying for programs in any of the five fields: medicine; liberal arts; science, technology, and engineering; architecture; and education. Students may choose to take the tests that are required by the program they are applied.
  - TPAT1: Medical Aptitude Test (developed by the consortium of Thai medical schools, COTMES)
  - TPAT2: Liberal arts Aptitude Test
  - TPAT3: Scientific, technological, and engineering Aptitude Test
  - TPAT4: Architecture Aptitude Test
  - TPAT5: Teaching and educational Aptitude Test
- A-Level - Applied Knowledge Level, also known as General Subject Tests (Thai: วิชาสามัญ).

=== Turkey ===
- Higher Education Institutions Examination
- YDT – Yabancı Dil Testi (Foreign Language Test ) hold in the following languages : English, German, Arabic, French, Russian.

=== Ukraine ===
- External independent evaluation – Test for all undergraduate students who are looking to enter a university in Ukraine.

=== United Kingdom ===
Most applicants to universities in the UK take national examinations such as A-levels or Scottish Highers. Separate admissions tests are used by some universities for specific subjects (law, mathematics, medicine, and some other courses at Cambridge, Imperial, Oxford and UCL).

==== Law ====
- LNAT – National Admissions Test for Law (Bristol, Cambridge, Durham, Glasgow, King's College London, Oxford, SOAS and UCL).

==== Mathematics ====
- STEP – Sixth Term Examination Paper in Mathematics (Cambridge, Imperial and Warwick).
- TMUA – Test of Mathematics for University Admission (Durham, Imperial, LSE, Cambridge, Oxford, Warwick and UCL)

==== Medicine ====
- UCAT – University Clinical Aptitude Test (Aberdeen, Anglia Ruskin, Aston, Bangor, Birmingham, Brighton and Sussex Medical School, Bristol, Brunel, Cambridge, Cardiff, Chester, City St George's, Dundee, East Anglia, Edge Hill, Edinburgh, Exeter, Glasgow, Greater Manchester, Hertfordshire, Hull York Medical School, Imperial, Keele, Kent and Medway Medical School, King's College London, Lancashire, Lancaster, Leeds, Leicester, Lincoln, Liverpool, Manchester, Newcastle, Nottingham, Oxford, Pears Cumbria School of Medicine, Plymouth, Portsmouth, Queen Mary University of London, Queen's Belfast, Sheffield, Southampton, St Andrews, St Mary's, Sunderland, Surrey, Swansea, UCL, Warwick, and Worcester)
- GAMSAT – Graduate Medical School Admissions Test (Brunel, Chester, City St George's, East Anglia, Exeter, Keele, Liverpool, Pears Cumbria School of Medicine, Plymouth, ScotGEM (St Andrews and Dundee), Sunderland, Surrey, Swansea, Ulster, and Worcester)

==== Other ====
- College admission assessments (some subjects at Cambridge)
- ESAT – Engineering and Science Admissions Test (some engineering and science subjects at Imperial, Cambridge, Oxford and UCL)
- TARA – Test of Academic Reasoning For Admissions (some subjects at Oxford and UCL)

=== United States ===
- SAT – formerly Scholastic Aptitude Test, now Scholastic Assessment Test.
  - SAT Subject Tests (discontinued in 2021)
- ACT – formerly American College Testing Program or American College Test.
- Advanced Placement (AP).
- CLT – Classic Learning Test.
- THEA – Texas Higher Education Assessment.
- GED – HSE or High School Diploma Equivalent; GED, HiSET or TASC brand of tests, depending on the State.
- PERT – Replaced Accuplacer as the standard college placement test in Florida.
- MCAT - Medical College Admission Test.
- LSAT - Law School Admission Test.

=== Vietnam ===
- TSĐHCĐ – Universities and Colleges Selection Examination (Tuyển sinh đại học và cao đẳng) (2002–2014)
- THPTQG – National High School Examination (Kỳ thi trung học phổ thông quốc gia) (2015–2019)
- TNTHPT – High School Graduation Examination (Kỳ thi tốt nghiệp trung học phổ thông) (2020–present)
  - ĐGNL – Aptitude Tests (Đánh giá năng lực) (VNU, VNU-HCM, Vietnamese police academies, HNUE, HCMUE)
  - TSA – Thinking Skills Assessment (Đánh giá tư duy) (Hanoi University of Science and Technology)
  - Some other universities' own aptitude tests

== Postgraduate/Professional schools ==
=== Australia ===
- GAMSAT – Graduate Australian Medical Schools Admissions Test.
- LSAT – Law School Admission Test (some Juris Doctor programs).
- IELTS (academic) – International English Language Test (for international students).

=== Bangladesh ===
- Postgraduate Admission Test – Each university in Bangladesh applies a different methodology to admit prospective Masters students. But usually, they have to appear in the Masters/Postgraduate Admission Test (different subject have different names). Some universities do not require any admission test.

=== Brazil ===
- ANPEC – Admission test for Postgraduate studies in Economics.
- ANPAD – Admission test for Postgraduate studies in Business Administration.
- POSCOMP – Admission test for Postgraduate studies in Computer Science.

=== China ===
- Nationwide Master's Program Unified Admissions Examination – Admission test for all graduate schools in mainland China. Subjects may vary.

=== Colombia ===
- ECAES – Examen de Estado de Calidad de la Educación Superior.

=== Germany ===
- TM-WISO – Admission test for master programmes in economics, business administration and social sciences.

=== India ===
- Business Admissions Test – Used by ISB for admissions to their Postgraduate Programme in Management for Family Businesses.
- CSIR-UGC NET – All India test for entrance into Science Ph.D. programs and for eligibility to teach at undergraduate level across India. Having qualification as a lectureship from CSIR-UGC NET is compulsory for teaching across Indian colleges and universities at undergraduate and postgraduate level.
- CBSE-UGC NET – Entrance examination for Ph.D. in humanities and languages across India.
- Common Admission Test (CAT) – For entry to the management programs at Indian Institutes of Management (IIMs) and various other business schools in India.
- Graduate Aptitude Test in Engineering (GATE), Joint Admission Test to M.Sc. (JAM) and Joint Management Entrance Test (JMET) – Standard means of entry to various graduate courses at Indian Institute of Science (IISc) and the Indian Institutes of Technology (IITs).
- Management Aptitude Test (MAT) – For admission to Master of Business Administration, Master of Management Studies, etc. programs.
- XLRI Admission Test (XAT) – For admission to the management program at Xavier Labour Relations Institute.
- Graduate Pharmacy Aptitude Test (GPAT) – For entry to the master programs in the pharmacy.
- National Institute of Pharmaceutical Education and Research (NIPER) – For entry to seven institutes of the Indian government.
- JEST – JEST EXAM which have two phases of examination where the first phase is objective and second phase is subjective, by getting ranked in this test the student can be admitted into affiliated universities and institutes across India, for Physics and Computer Science Ph.D. programs.
- CLAT - PG - CLAT PG is entrance test for entry in LLM course to national law Universities in India.
- Telangana State Integrated Common Entrance Test (TS ICET) - is a state level entrance exam for the candidates clearing the exam will be eligible to get an admission into MBA (Master of Business Administration) and MCA courses with in Telangana state.
- Andhra Pradesh Integrated Common Entrance Test (AP ICET) - is a state level entrance exam for the candidates to pursue MBA, M.Sc. and MCA courses with in the Andhra Pradesh State.
- NEET-PG - The National Eligibility Entrance Test (Postgraduate) is a qualifying and ranking examination in India, for students who wish to study various postgraduate Doctor of Medicine, Master of Surgery and diploma courses, in government or private medical colleges in India.
- NEET-MDS - National Eligibility cum Entrance Test for Masters of Dental Surgery abbreviated as NEET MDS is an entrance exam conducted by NBE for providing admissions to all the postgraduate dental courses offered by the institutions in India. NEET MDS exam is an eligibility-cum-ranking examination conducted annually in online mode. Except for NEET MDS, no other exams, either at the state or institution level are valid for admission in PG dental courses.*
- TISSNET - Tata Institute of Social Sciences, Mumbai conducts TISS National Entrance Test (TISSNET). It is a university-level entrance exam conducted for admission to MA programmes in the School of Management and Labour Studies. The PG programme in Human Resources Management and Labour Relations offered at TISS campuses is at par with the management programmes offered by top MBA colleges in India. The entrance exam is held in CBT mode and the exam paper comprises questions from English Proficiency, Mathematical Skills & Logical Reasoning, and General Awareness.*
- Joint Admission Test for M.Sc. – Joint Admission Test for M.Sc. is a national level entrance exam. Graduates can complete their M.Sc. or Master's from India's reputed institutes like IITs and IISc through JAM.

=== Pakistan ===
- GAT-General – Graduate Assessment Test, for admission in M.S./M.Phil. programs.
- GAT-Subject – Graduate Assessment Test, for admission in Ph.D. programs.

=== Turkey ===
- TUS – Graduate Medical Schools Admissions Test.
- ALES – Academic Personnel and Postgraduate Education Entrance Examination.

=== United States and Canada ===
- Miller Analogies Test (MAT)
- Graduate Record Examination (GRE)
- Graduate Management Admission Test (GMAT)
- Medical College Admission Test (MCAT)
- Dental Admission Test (DAT) (United States)
- Dental Aptitude Test (DAT) (Canada)
- Optometry Admission Test (OAT)
- Pharmacy College Admission Test (PCAT)
- Test of Essential Academic Skills (TEAS)
- Veterinary College Admission Test (VCAT) (Has not been offered since April 2003)
- Allied Health Professions Admission Test (AHPAT)
- Law School Admission Test (LSAT)

== See also ==
- List of primary and secondary school tests
- List of secondary school leaving qualifications
- List of language proficiency tests
