= List of primary and secondary school tests =

This is a list of primary and secondary school tests.

Tests available at the end of secondary school, like Regents Examinations in New York, California High School Exit Exam, GED across North America, GCE A-Level in the UK, might lead to a school-leaving certificate(diploma). However, other tests like SAT and ACT do not play such roles.

== Africa ==
- Uganda Advanced Certificate of Education

== Americas ==
- General Educational Development (GED)
- Advanced Placement Program
- SAT
  - PSAT
- ACT (test)
  - PLAN (test)
- Basic Elementary Skills Test
- California High School Exit Exam – California
- Connecticut Academic Performance Test – Connecticut
- Connecticut Mastery Test – Connecticut
- Florida Comprehensive Assessment Test (FCAT) – Florida
- Commonwealth Accountability Testing System (CATS) – Kentucky
- High School Proficiency Assessment – New Jersey
- Indiana Statewide Testing for Educational Progress (ISTEP) – Indiana
- Regents Examinations – New York
- Michigan Merit Exam – Michigan
- Massachusetts Comprehensive Assessment System – Massachusetts
- State of Texas Assessment of Academic Readiness (STAAR) – Texas
- Tennessee Comprehensive Assessment Program (TCAP) – Tennessee
- Ohio Graduation Test – Ohio
- Pennsylvania System of School Assessment – Pennsylvania
- Standards of Learning – Virginia
- Washington Assessment of Student Learning – Washington
- Georgia High School Graduation Test – Georgia
- Colorado Student Assessment Program (CSAPs) – Colorado
- HSPT – High School Placement Test

=== for Admission ===
- SHSAT – Specialized High Schools Admissions Test for New York City
- ISEE – Independent School Entrance Examination
- SSAT – Secondary School Admission Test
- TACHS – Test for Admission into Catholic High Schools (New York City, Long Island, Westchester)

== Asia ==
- All India Senior School Certificate Examination - the final examination conducted every year for seniors secondary school students by the Central Board of Secondary Education on behalf of the Government of India.
- Sijil Tinggi Persekolahan Malaysia – Malaysian Higher School Certificate is a test usually taken by students at the end of Form 5
- UPSR – Entrance test into Secondary Schools for Malaysia
- HKDSE – Hong Kong Diploma of Secondary Education Examination. Taken by Form 6 students, used for universities admission.
- PSLE – Entrance test into Secondary Schools for Singapore
- OKS – Entrance test into Secondary Schools for Turkey
- National High School Graduation Examination – Vietnam

== Europe ==
- CITO Toets – The Netherlands
- Common Entrance Examination – For entry into public schools in the UK
- Eleven-plus – For entry to grammar schools in the UK
- European Baccalaureate
- International Baccalaureate Diploma
- GCE A-level – England, Wales and Northern Ireland
  - AQA Baccalaureate
- Access to HE Diploma
- Welsh Baccalaureate
- Scottish Higher/Advanced Higher – Scotland
- Cambridge Pre-U Diploma
- Leaving Certificate (Árdteistiméireacht) – the Republic of Ireland
- Abitur – Germany
- Baccalauréat – France
- Selectividad – Spain
- Maturità – Italy
- Matura – Austria, Poland

== Oceania ==
- Higher School Certificate – New South Wales External Assessment
- Victorian Certificate of Education/Victorian Certificate of Applied Learning
- Queensland Certificate of Education
- South Australian Certificate of Education
- Western Australian Certificate of Education
- Tasmanian Certificate of Education
- Australian Capital Territory Year 12 Certificate
- Northern Territory Certificate of Education
- National Certificate of Educational Achievement – New Zealand Assessment

== See also ==
- List of secondary school leaving qualifications
- List of admission tests to colleges and universities
