= Pert =

Pert or PERT may refer to:

== Ships ==
- HMS Pert, various Royal Navy ships
- USS Pert (1812) - see List of United States Navy ships: P
- USS Pert, a World War II corvette, originally HMS Nepeta
- Pert (sidewheeler), a 19th-century steamboat that operated in British Columbia, Canada

== People ==
- Pert (surname)
- Pert Kelton (1907–1968), American actress

== PERT ==
- Pancreatic enzyme replacement therapy, a treatment for exocrine pancreatic insufficiency
- Party of Economic Reforms of Tajikistan, a centrist political party
- Prime editing-mediated readthrough of premature termination codons, a genome-editing strategy in genetics
- Program evaluation and review technique, a planning method
- Postsecondary Education Readiness Test, a placement test used by Florida high schools and colleges

== Other uses ==
- Pert Plus, a brand of shampoo marketed in Australia and New Zealand as Pert
- Pert, Texas, United States, an unincorporated community
- $P e ^ {rt}$, an expression to calculate the expected return from a continuously compounded investment given the principal, rate, and time

== See also ==
- PERT distribution, in statistics
- Peart, a surname
