= Christ the King Regional High School =

Catholic school in Queens, New York

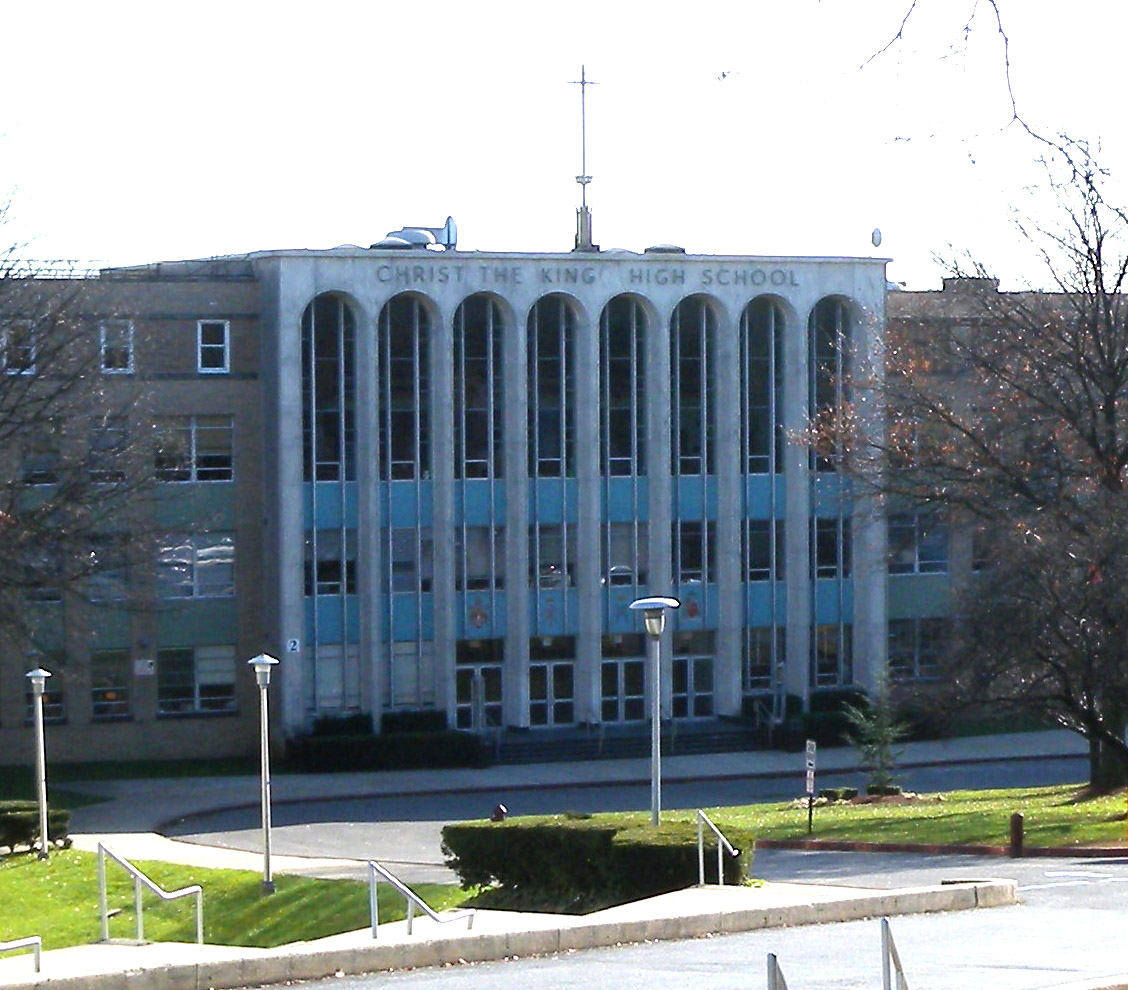
- Main entrance on Metropolitan Avenue

Location
- 68-02 Metropolitan Avenue; Middle Village, Queens, New York City, New York 11379; United States; 40°42′39″N 73°53′18″W

Information
- Type: Private, Coeducational
- Motto: Once a Royal, Always a Royal
- Religious affiliations: Roman Catholic; Regional
- Patron saint: Saint Carlo Acutis
- Established: 1962
- Authority: Arch Diocese of Brooklyn
- President: Veronica Cokely
- Dean: Maria Spagnolo
- Administrator: Joseph Arbitello
- Principal: Joseph Arbitello
- Chaplain: Fr. Frank Spacek
- Faculty: 32
- Teaching staff: 32
- Grades: 9-12
- Average class size: 25-40
- Student to teacher ratio: 1:35
- Campus: Urban
- Colors: Maroon and Gold
- Athletics conference: Catholic AAA
- Sports: Football and Basketball
- Mascot: The Royal
- Team name: Royals
- Rival: Bishop Loughlin Memorial High School
- Accreditation: Middle States Association of Colleges and Schools
- Newspaper: Royal Times
- Yearbook: Revelation
- School fees: $420.00 Registration Fee (2023-2024)
- Tuition: $11,90 (2025-2026)
- Enrollment Exam: T.A.C.H.S
- Website: ctkhsny.org

Christ the King Regional High School is a co-educational, college preparatory, Catholic high school for grades 9–12 located in Middle Village, Queens, New York, United States and established in 1962. It is located within the Roman Catholic Diocese of Brooklyn. The school is next to the Middle Village–Metropolitan Avenue station of the New York City Subway's M train.

== History ==
Originally built and operated by the Roman Catholic Diocese of Brooklyn as a diocesan high school, Christ the King High School began with its first freshman class starting September 1962 with its teachers at Mater Christi High School in Astoria, Queens. The first classes at the unfinished Middle Village location were held on May 6, 1963 and the school building was dedicated in April 1964.

At its start, Christ the King was organized into separate boys and girls divisions staffed by two religious orders of Marist Brothers and Daughters of Wisdom. The two divisions occupied opposite wings of the building and shared its library, cafeteria and auditorium. The top floors of the separate wings were designed and built as residential facilities to accommodate the two religious orders living areas.

The first graduation took place on June 23, 1966 with 840 graduates, exactly split between 420 boys and girls. Attendance at all of the Brooklyn Diocese operated high schools was free until September 1968 when it initiated a $300 tuition charge.

By 1970, the enormous changes underway in Catholic religious orders compelled the Sisters of Wisdom to withdraw from staffing the Girls Division and coeducational classes were started to transition into merging the two divisions. In September 1971, Mr. Hugh Kirwan became the first lay Principal of the Girl's Division. In 1972 the Marist Brothers announced they would be ending their connection with the school.

In September 1973 Mr. Kirwin was appointed to run a unified school at a time of serious discord with the rapidly expanding lay faculty that delayed opening of classes for one week. After two years of futile negotiations, no contract was signed and in October 1975 the Bishop announced that Christ the King High School would be closed and seniors would be allowed to finish there, but all other students would be transferred to other diocesan schools.

The diocese plan outraged the students and supported by their families, they went on strike and refused to vacate the building. Discussions between the school supporters and the diocese finally resulted in September 1976 becoming Christ the King Regional High School.

== Academics ==
The school offers various honors and Advanced Placement classes. Select students have received outstanding PSAT and SAT scores. Numerous students have been accepted into prestigious schools, such as Yale, UPenn, Fordham University, Johns Hopkins University, and Macaulay Honors College and receive substantial scholarships to lesser prestigious institutions. Admission is based upon 6th, 7th, and 8th grade records, as well as the TACHS exam.

== Athletics ==
This school is well known for athletics, especially its basketball teams. They have at least one mythical national championship for girls basketball in 2005. The girls basketball team won eleven straight Class A A New York State Federation girls' title from 1990-2000. They also won Class AA titles in 2005, 2006, 2010 and 2019. The boys basketball team has won the 1989, 2010, 2013, and 2014 State Federation titles. Christ the King has produced well-known basketball stars such as Lamar Odom, Sue Bird, Chamique Holdsclaw, Tina Charles, Rawle Alkins, Jayson Williams, Omar Cook, Speedy Claxton, Jose Alvarado, and Khalid Reeves.

Christ the King offers a wide variety of sports including bowling, cross country fall, handball, indoor track winter and soccer. The boys-only programs are baseball, ice hockey, football and outdoor track winter. The girls-only programs are softball, cheerleading, dance, swimming, tennis and volleyball. The CK Royal Step team is co-ed. Christ the King also has a fitness center.

== Clubs ==
Clubs include art, broadcasting (formerly Royal Vision), ceramics, computer, key club, literary & art magazine, national honor society, performing arts, portfolio Royal Times (newspaper), PDHP (Program for the Development of Human Potential) Prevention Leadership, speech & debate team, theater arts and video yearbook & yearbook, rosary club, international, and freshman, sophomore, junior and senior student councils.

== Controversy ==
In February 2018, a Year 12 student was denied a custom sweater with their name. The student bore a name with striking resemblance to civil rights activist Malcolm X. As a result, the refusal was cited as being of the grounds of discrimination and racism. The student remarked in being told "not wanting to be associated with that name.", and was jokingly called "the new Malcolm X." Outrage from the incident would result in rallying at the school intended to bring awareness of racism in education.

== Notable alumni ==
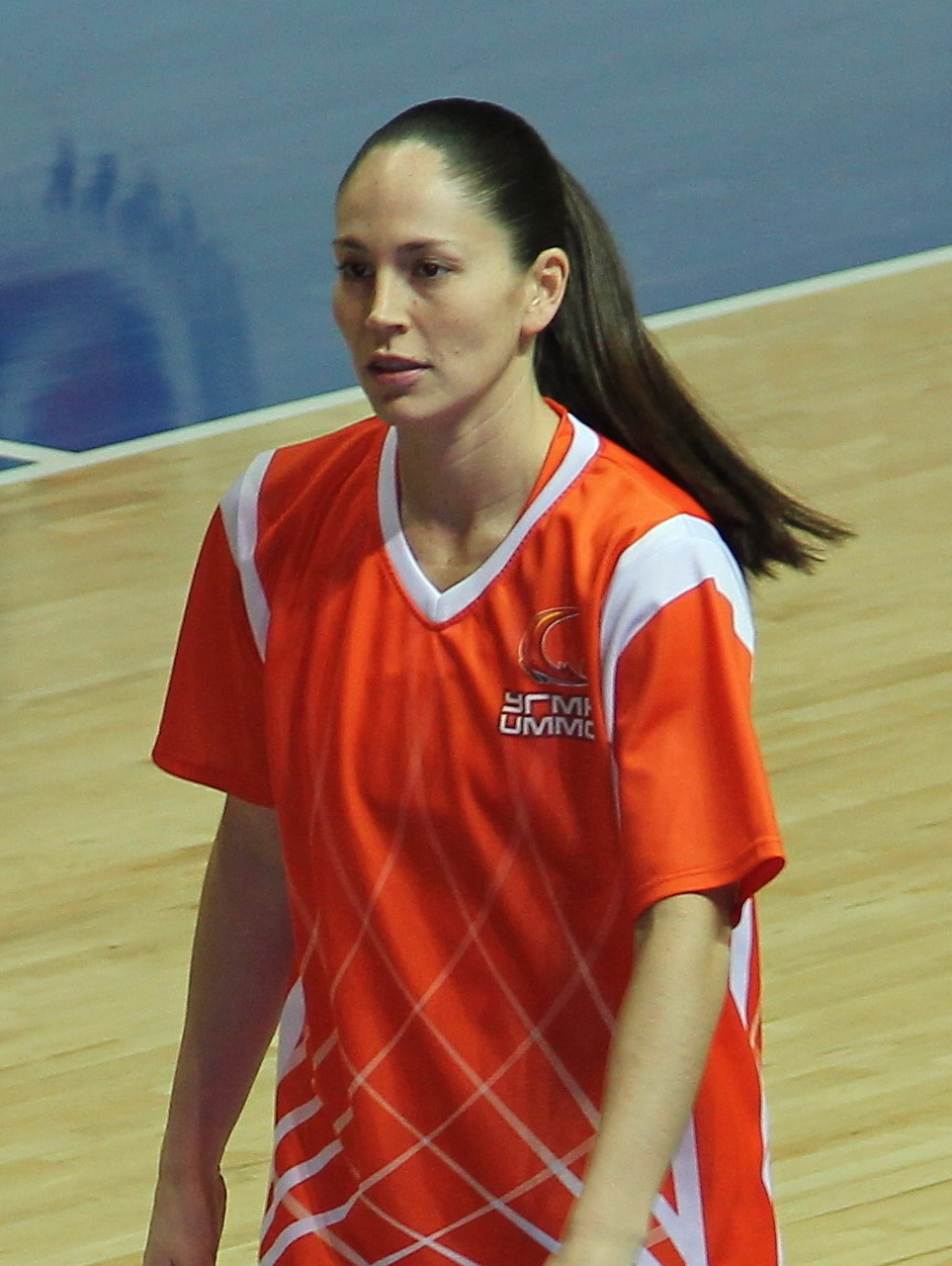
Sue Bird

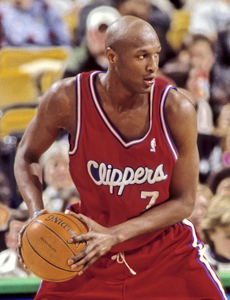
Lamar Odom

- Ray Abruzzo, actor (The Sopranos)
- Wendell Alexis, retired basketball player and three-time MVP of the German Bundesliga
- Rawle Alkins (born 1997), basketball player in the Israeli Basketball Premier League
- Jose Alvarado (basketball), ACC Defensive Player of the Year, NBA player for the New York Knicks
- Erick Barkley, former NBA player
- J. Darius Bikoff, founder and CEO of Energy Brands
- Sue Bird '98, Women's National Basketball Association point guard, five-time Olympic champion, Naismith Award winner and Women's Basketball Hall of Fame inductee, twelve-time All-Star (Seattle Storm), 4× WNBA champion (2004, 2010, 2018, 2020 Seattle Storm)
- Tina Charles '06, three-time Olympic champion, WNBA player for the Atlanta Dream, two-time NCAA Champion
- Jason Cipolla, former Syracuse Orange basketball player
- Speedy Claxton, former NBA player
- Kofi Cockburn, basketball player
- Anthony Como, politician
- Omar Cook, professional American basketball player and two-time Montenegrin league champion (KK Budućnost)
- Richard J. Daly, executive
- Shay Doron (born 1985), Israeli WNBA basketball guard (New York Liberty)
- Jared Harrison-Hunte (born 2000), NFL defensive tackle for the Carolina Panthers
- Chamique Holdsclaw '95, University of Tennessee, Olympic champion, WNBA player for the Atlanta Dream and the San Antonio Silver Stars Naismith Basketball Hall of Fame inductee.
- Steve Karsay, Major League Baseball pitcher
- Daniel G. McGowan, environmental activist jailed and fined in 2006 for his involvement with Earth Liberation Front actions
- Lamar Odom, retired American basketball player NBA and two-time NBA champion (Los Angeles Lakers), NBA Sixth Man of the Year
- Chris Ortiz, basketball player in Puerto Rico
- Derrick Phelps, former professional basketball player and current Associate Head Coach at Washington State University
- Tarik Phillip (born 1993), British-American basketball player in the Israel Basketball Premier League
- Khalid Reeves, University of Arizona Wildcats and NBA player 1994-2000, including Miami Heat and Chicago Bulls
- Olivia Vukoša, basketball player
- Tyson Walker (born 2000), college basketball player for the Michigan State Spartans
- Allen Watson, former MLB pitcher and 2-time World Series champion with the New York Yankees
- Jayson Williams (born 1968), former NBA player for the Philadelphia 76ers and New Jersey Nets.
