= California High School Proficiency Exam =

Early exit testing program established under California law

- Acronym: CHSPE
- Type: Paper-based, early-exit testing program
- Administrator: California State Board of Education
- Skills tested: Mathematics, English-language arts (reading and writing)
- Purpose: Early-exit from high school
- Year started: 1974
- Year terminated: 2023
- Duration: 3.5 hours
- Score range: 250–450 (multiple-choice) and 1-5 (writing).
- Offered: Thrice annually
- Regions: California
- Languages: English
- Prerequisites: Age 16+ or enrolled in at least two semesters of 10th grade
- Fee: $230 (2020-2021)
- Website: cde.ca.gov/ta/tg/cp.asp

The California High School Proficiency Exam (CHSPE) was an early exit testing program established under California law (California Education Code Section 48412). Testers who passed the CHSPE received a high school equivalency (HSE) diploma granted by the California State Board of Education, the Certificate of Proficiency.

All individuals and institutions subject to California law that require a high school diploma are required to accept the Certificate of Proficiency as equal to one. However, it is not equivalent to completion of coursework required to graduate high school. The U.S. Office of Personnel Management has ruled it acceptable in federal civilian employment applications, and the U.S. Department of Education recognizes the CHSPE as a high school diploma equivalent for various purposes, including financial aid applications. The University of California system accepts the Certificate of Proficiency awarded by the State Board of Education upon successful completion of CHSPE.

In 2023, the exam program was discontinued and replaced by the California Proficiency Program. This was due to the SAT10, the examination the CHSPE was based on, becoming obsolete and the new CPP being administered by the HiSET and GED.

== Eligibility ==
While current enrollment in school was not required, testers had to be at least 16 years old or enrolled in at least two semesters of the 10th grade. Students enrolled in schools outside of California could not register until they were sixteen years of age. Testers had to pay a fee of $230 (2021–2022) by the regular registration deadline or more if late, and sit during one or more of the three (two in 2022) exam dates offered a year.

== Structure ==
The exam tested individuals based on the high school curriculum in California using a format similar to that of the Stanford Achievement Test (SAT10). Those who had previously taken the California High School Exit Exam (CAHSEE), required of all high school students to graduate in California, found the CHSPE similar in format, but longer in length and with more difficult, rigorous questions.

The CHSPE tests included mathematics and English-Language Arts (reading and writing). The English-Language Arts section included grammar and vocabulary questions, and also asked the examinee to write an essay. The math section assessed students on geometry, algebra, and pre-algebra. Testers had three and a half hours to complete the exam and were free to divide their time as they wished between the two sections.

=== Mathematics ===
The CHSPE mathematics section had 50 multiple-choice questions broken into 5 content clusters: number sense and operations; patterns, relationships, and algebra; data, statistics, and probability; and geometry and measurement. Testers had to score at least 350 within a range of 250–450 to pass the math section.

=== English language arts ===
The CHSPE English-language arts section had two subtests of reading and language (writing).

==== Reading ====
The reading subtest had 84 multiple-choice questions broken into seven content clusters: initial understanding; interpretation; critical analysis; strategies; synonyms; multiple meaning words; and context clues. Testers had to score at least 350 within a range of 250–450 to pass the reading subtest.

==== Language with writing ====
The language subtest had 48 multiple-choice questions broken into six content clusters: capitalization; usage; punctuation; sentence structure; pre-writing; content and organization, in addition to a writing subtask. Testers had to score at least 350 within a range of 250–450 on the language subtest, in addition to at least a 2.5 within a score range of 1–5 on the writing subtask to pass the English-language arts section.

== CHSPE vs. GED ==
The CHSPE was based on the SAT10 and only administered in English, targeted at homeschoolers, students who wanted to legally conclude high school before 18, and/or start college early, such as gifted and talented ed students. Other alumni included entertainment industry or agriculture professionals who preferred to start working at an earlier age.

In contrast, the GED was traditionally only for people over 18 years of age.

In 2023, the CHSPE was replaced with the California Proficiency Program (CPP). The new CPP was to be administered by both the GED and the HiSET. The HiSET was the first to release, in 2023.

== Benefits ==
Upon passing the exam, testers receive a legal, high school equivalency certificate and official transcript containing a score report, which can be used to enroll in college early. As with any college enrollment, assessment tests may be required upon college entrance to determine the student's ability for placement in the appropriate courses.

Testers under 18 years of age who pass the exam may not leave high school without parent or guardian consent. The CHSPE eliminates the need for minors to get a work permit before being employed, but is not otherwise considered "emancipation," and laws regulating minors still apply.

== Notable alumni ==
- Chyler Leigh – Grey's Anatomy actress, singer and model
- Michael Eric Reid – American actor
- Dove Cameron – American actress and singer
- Austin Butler – American actor
- Virginia Gardner – American actress
- Emma Chamberlain - American social media personality
- Ashley D. Escobar - American writer

=== Fictional ===
- Simon Camden – a 7th Heaven main character passes the CHSPE to start college early in season 8, episode 3 "PK (Preacher's Kid)"

== See also ==
- High school graduation examination in the United States
- HiSET
- CAHSEE
- GED
