= CTB =

CTB may refer to:

== Companies and organizations ==
- CTB/McGraw-Hill, a division of the McGraw-Hill Companies
- California Testing Bureau, a division of the McGraw-Hill Companies
- Canadian Tire Bank, the retail deposit-taking and credit card-issuing arm of Canadian Tire Corporation, Limited
- Ceylon Transport Board, the nationalised passenger transport venture in Sri Lanka
- Christchurch Transport Board, a defunct municipal public transport operator in Christchurch, New Zealand
- Citybus (Hong Kong), a public bus operator in Hong Kong
- Cooper Tire & Rubber Company's NYSE ticker symbol
- CTB International

== Science and technology ==
- Cement-treated Base, a specific type of soil cement, used as a base
- Cholera toxin B, a subunit of cholera toxin used for retrograde tracing
- Coding tree block, a processing unit of the High Efficiency Video Coding (HEVC) video standard
- CT (computer tomography) scan of the brain
- .ctb, Color-dependent Plot Style Table, a file extension used by AutoCAD

== Places ==
- City of Thunder Bay, a Canadian town in Ontario
- Commonwealth of The Bahamas
- Crabtree Technology Building, a Brigham Young University building
- Cut Bank Municipal Airport, an airport near Cut Bank, Montana, U.S., by IATA code
- Castletownbere or Castletown Berehaven, an Irish town in Co Cork.

== Other uses ==
- Catch the Beat, an alternative game mode in Dean "peppy" Herbert's osu! rhythm game
- Comprehensive Test Ban, the goal of the Comprehensive Test Ban Treaty
- Crash Thunder Buster, a finishing move of Jyushin Thunder Liger
- Ryan Giggs or CTB, the claimant in CTB v News Group Newspapers and CTB v. Twitter Inc., Persons Unknown
