= Cathedral School (Maine) =

Location
- 14 Locust Street; Portland, Maine 04101; United States; 43°39′44″N 70°15′14″W

Information
- Founded: 1864
- Status: Closed
- Closed: 2011
- Grades: K–8
- Website: www.cathedralportland.com

Cathedral School was a private, Roman Catholic school in Portland, Maine. Cathedral School was founded by Sisters of Notre Dame de Namur in 1864. The school offered classes from kindergarten to 8th grade. It was the "mother school" of Maine's parochial school system. Shortly after temporarily housing what was formerly known as West School from 2012-2013, the building became home to Portland Adult Education, an adult education program committed to helping adults take the HiSET test, a GED equivalent, and, in certain circumstances, earn a high school diploma.

== History ==
St. Aloysius School was founded in 1864 in downtown Portland, Maine. Burned down in the 1866 Great Fire in Portland, the school was rebuilt in the current structure in 1876. In 2011, 63% of students at the school were receiving financial aid and the school faced rising costs of operation. In 2010–11, enrollment was 136 students. The cost per student was $4,200 but the highest tuition was $3,925, leaving massive deficits. The school closed at the end of the 2011 school year.
