= Pert (surname) =

Pert is a surname. Notable people with the surname include:

- Brian Pert (born 1936), Australian rules footballer
- Candace Pert (1946–2013), American neuroscientist and pharmacologist
- Claude Ernest Pert (1898–1982), British Indian Army major general and British India polo champion
- Gary Pert (born 1965), Australian rules footballer
- Geoffrey James Pert - see List of Fellows of the Royal Society elected in 1995
- Morris Pert (1947–2010), Scottish composer
- Nicholas Pert (born 1981), English chess player
- Sid Pert (1890–1966), a pioneer Australian rugby league footballer who played in the 1900s and 1910s
- Sid Pert, Jr. (born 1933), Australian rugby league footballer, son of the above
- Thomas Spert (died 1541), sometimes spelled Pert, English vice admiral in service to King Henry VIII

== See also ==
- Pert (disambiguation)
- Rochelle Perts (born 1992), Dutch singer, winner of the talent show X Factor in 2011
- Peart
- Pertz
