= List of people from Swindon =

Swindon is a large town in Wiltshire, England; its residents are called Swindonians and many have achieved notability throughout its history.

- Heidi Alexander – Labour Party MP for Swindon South
- Sam Allen – football manager at Swindon Town
- Joseph Armstrong – engineer and the second locomotive superintendent of the Great Western Railway lived, worked and is buried in Swindon
- Dean Ashton – Premiership footballer, played for West Ham United, born in Swindon
- Colin Bailey – drummer
- Ralph Bates – writer
- Carl Benjamin – YouTuber, political commentator better known as Sargon of Akkad
- Billy Bodin – footballer, born in Swindon
- Mark A. Brennan – Canadian landscape painter, born in Swindon, 1968
- Jazz Carlin – swimmer, World Champion in 400m and 800m freestyle
- Lucy Cohu – actress, born in Swindon, 1968
- Julian Clary – comedian, formerly a resident of Rodbourne, but not born in Swindon. His family still lives in the area.
- Jamie Cox – boxer, ABA light-welterweight champion. Won a gold medal for the England team at the 2006 Commonwealth Games in Melbourne, Australia.
- Jack Dangers – musician, producer, founder of electronic band Meat Beat Manifesto
- Rick Davies – founder and member of the band Supertramp
- Diana Dors – actress, born in Swindon; celebrated by a larger-than-life-statue outside the West Swindon cinema complex
- John Eatwell – Baron Eatwell, economist and Labour peer
- Harold Fleming (footballer) – Swindon Town footballer 1907–1924, capped nine times for England
- John Francome – novelist, sports commentator and former jockey
- Sam Fuller - drummer for punk rock band Peter and the Test Tube Babies
- Charlie George - comedian and comedy writer
- Mark Harper – Conservative Party politician was born in Swindon
- Mehdi Hasan – British-American broadcaster and journalist, born in Swindon
- Tommy Hatto – actor, most notable in the films Thor: The Dark World and Jennifer Lopez: Dance Again 3D. Born in Swindon.
- Justin Hayward – lead guitarist, vocalist and composer for The Moody Blues
- David Hempleman-Adams – explorer
- Alex Henshall – footballer for Manchester City. Born in Swindon.
- Nick Hewer – public relations officer and businessman. One of Alan Sugar's advisers on The Apprentice. Born in the town.
- David Howell – Ryder Cup golfer and five-time winner on the European Tour
- Richard Jefferies – Victorian nature writer, born at Coate
- David Murray John – Swindon's town clerk 1938–1974 and a driving force behind Swindon's development and growth
- Bob Kilby – speedway rider
- Samuel Knaggs – British colonial administrator born in Swindon
- Josh Kumra – singer and songwriter
- Mark Lamarr – TV presenter, comedian, and radio DJ. Grew up in Park South.
- Jon Lewis – England and Gloucestershire cricketer
- Melinda Messenger – former glamour model and television presenter
- Antony Micallef – artist
- Hannah Miley – swimmer, 400m medley champion at the World Short Course Championships
- Desmond Morris – zoologist, ethologist and artist, born just outside Swindon and moved to the town as a child
- Levi Lapper Morse – grocer and draper and Liberal Party politician who was 2nd mayor of Swindon and an MP.
- William Ewart Morse – Son of Levi Lapper Morse, Liberal Party politician, mayor of Swindon for 2 years and an MP.
- Edith New – suffragette, born in Swindon
- Gilbert O'Sullivan – Irish born, Swindon raised, singer/songwriter
- William Overton – cricketer
- Charlie Paynter – manager of West Ham United, 1932–1950
- Bob Peart – football player with Burnley, Swindon Town, Headington United, Cheltenham Town
- Billie Piper – actress and former pop singer, played Rose in the 2005/2006 seasons and the 2008 season final of BBC Sci-Fi TV programme Doctor Who
- Don Rogers – Swindon Town footballer
- Leonard Rwodzi (known professionally as S1mba) – rapper, born in Zimbabwe but grew up in Swindon
- Rachel Shelley – actress (The L Word, Ghost Whisperer), born in Swindon
- Tim Smith – Radio 2 broadcaster and co-presenter of Radio 2's "Steve Wright in the Afternoon"
- Sir William Arthur Stanier – Chief Mechanical Engineer of the London, Midland and Scottish Railway, member of the Royal Society, designed Princess Coronation Class engines, born in Wellington Street, Swindon in 1876
- Ben Thatcher – football player with Ipswich Town F.C.
- Mark G. Thomas – scientist
- Alfred Williams – hammerman at the GWR works 1892–1914, author, poet and collector of folk songs
- Tom Wisdom – actor (300, The Boat That Rocked)
- XTC – pop rock band from Swindon
  - Terry Chambers – founding member, drummer from 1972 to 1982. Born in Swindon.
  - Dave Gregory – lead guitarist from 1979 to 1999. Born in Swindon.
  - Colin Moulding – founding member, second songwriter, vocalist, and bassist for the band. Born in Swindon.
  - Andy Partridge – founding member, guitarist and chief songwriter. Born in Malta, raised in Swindon, where he lives.
- Thaila Zucchi – Italian/British singer and actress, starred in Balls of Steel
