= Peart =

Peart is a surname. Notable people with the surname include:

- Alan Peart (1922–2018), New Zealand Second World War flying ace
- Bob Peart (1926–1966), English football player
- Charles Peart (1759–1798), British sculptor
- Darrell Peart (born 1950), American furniture maker and designer
- Edward Peart (1756?–1824), English physician
- Ernest Grafford Peart (1918–1981), Jamaican politician and diplomat
- Fred Peart, Baron Peart (1914–1988), British politician
- Greg Peart (born 1946), Australian former politician
- Jack Peart (1888–1948), English footballer
- Jack Peart (footballer, born 1884) (1884–1965), English footballer
- John Peart (artist) (1945/1946–2013), Australian artist
- Joseph Peart (1900–1942), New Zealand Second World War army lieutenant colonel and headmaster
- Lee Peart (born 1990) British comedian and actor
- Matt Peart (born 1997), Jamaican-American football player
- Michael Peart (judge) (born 1953), Irish judge
- Michael Peart (politician) (fl. 2003–present), Jamaican politician
- Myles Peart-Harris (born 2002), English football player
- Neil Peart (1952–2020), Canadian musician and author, second drummer of Rush
- Neil Peart (footballer) (born 1958), former Australian rules footballer
- Paul Peart, British comics artist
- Ron Peart (1920–1999), English footballer
- Stirling Peart (1890–1963), American rugby union player
- Stanley Peart (1922–2019), British doctor and clinical researcher

== See also ==
- Pert (disambiguation)
