= The Cathedral School =

The Cathedral School may refer to:

- The Cathedral School, Townsville, Queensland, Australia
- The Cathedral School, Llandaff, Wales

In the United States:

- Cathedral School (Maine), in Portland (1864—2011)
- The Cathedral School, New York, of the Archdiocesan Cathedral of the Holy Trinity, New York City
- The Cathedral School of St. John the Divine, New York City
- Episcopal Collegiate School, formerly The Cathedral School, Little Rock, Arkansas
- National Cathedral School, Washington, D.C.
