= Iranian University Entrance Exam =

Standardized test

The Iranian University Entrance Exam, simply known as Konkour (Persian: کنکور; from the French Concours), is a standardized test used as one of the means to gain admission to higher education in Iran. In order to receive a PhD in non-medical majors, there are three exams, all of them called Konkour.

By 2023, 80% of top 3000 students were from private schools, while only 20 percent from public schools.

Iran had 2183 universities in 2022 and started a program to merge them and reduce the number down to 400 universities.

In September 2023, the Iranian government rolled back changes to the Exam to before 2020 and delayed changes until 14-06-2026, making the Exam a more important factor than high schools grades and finals.

== Rules change ==
Iranian Government's Supreme Council of Cultural Revolution In the 2020s, the structure of university enrollment admissions changed significantly, reducing the weight of this test exam to a smaller percentage of the total grade. Additionally, the test began to be held twice each year instead of once.

Since 2020s all of high school grades scores have 50% share of total admission test score instead of just University Entrance Exams. The entrance test results will be reduced to have 40% share of total rank, while high-school records will make up 60% of share of total university entrance ranking.

== Electronic test ==
In July 2023 for the first time in small scale it was done with computers. Iranian Minister of Science has a program to abandon paper nationally for college and schools exams.

== Nationwide ==
In June/July each year, high school graduates in Iran take a centralized nationwide university entrance exam seeking a place in one of the public universities. In recent years, although the government has responded to demands for improved access and to a rapid increase in the rising number of applicants by increasing the capacity of universities and creating the Islamic Azad University, public universities are still only able to accept 10 percent of all applicants.

== History and trends ==
In Iran, as in many other countries where a university entrance exam is a sole criterion for student selection, the Konkour exam is a 4.5-hour multiple-choice exam that covers all subjects taught in Iranian high schools, from math and science to Islamic studies and foreign languages.Those who fail are allowed to repeat the test in subsequent years until they pass it.

Number of applicants and admissions in Iranian University Entrance Exam from 2000 to 2013 / 1379 to 1392 SH

The Ministry of Science, Research, and Technology has established the Education Evaluation Organization to oversee all aspects of the test. As the sole criterion for student admissions into universities in Iran, Konkour has gone through many phases.

In pre-revolutionary Iran, the exam was — as it is currently — a comprehensive knowledge test and an assessment of academic achievement for admissions. However, the problem in that era was that the selection methods provided advantages to candidates from urban areas, especially those from the upper and upper-middle classes with better education and preparation. Thus, almost 70 to 80 percent of university entrants came from large cities.

In the early years of postrevolutionary Iran, the purpose of testing shifted from being a mere knowledge test to an instrument to ensure the "Islamization of universities," aimed at admitting students who were committed to the ideology of the 1979 revolution. The university entrance exam judged admissions candidates not only by their academic test score but also by their social and political background and loyalty to the Islamic government.

In the early 1980s, a quota system was introduced to allow underprivileged students preferential treatment. A year after the Iran-Iraq war ended, a law was passed to help handicapped and volunteer veterans enter universities, reserving 40 percent of university seats for war veterans.

An additional criterion for student selection was introduced in the early 1990s to localize the student population, giving priority to candidates who applied to study in their native provinces. This policy was to prevent student migration into the larger cities. The requirement of service after graduation was also instrumental in providing education and health to needy areas.

== Reform options ==
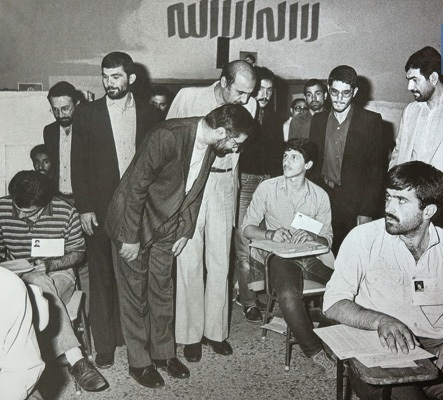
Prime Minister Mousavi visits a center of Iranian University Entrance Exam, June 1985.

In Iran, admission to university — especially to prestigious public and highly selective universities remains a means of achieving elevated status in a society in which education is a major determinant of class mobility. Graduates of such universities have a better chance of securing increasingly limited jobs in prestigious professions in Iran — such as medicine, engineering, and law — making success in the entrance exam the first and perhaps the most important hoop through which Iranian students must jump.

As the Konkour crisis persists, authorities are contemplating a replacement mechanism for student selection. One of the options being considered is to use the cumulative grade-point average (GPA) of the final three years of high school to admit students.

== See also ==
- SAT, the US equivalent
- List of admissions tests
- List of universities in Iran
- Higher education in Iran
