= List of colonial secretaries of Barbados =

The following is a list of colonial secretaries of Barbados:

Image	Colonial Secretary	Period in office
	Henry Joseph Steele Bradfield	1842 (acting?)
	Sir James Walker, K.C.M.G., C.B.	1842–1860
	James Richard Holligan	1862–1867
	Augustus F. Gore, C.M.G	1867–1877
	Rt. Hon. Sir Walter Francis Hely-Hutchinson, G.C.M.G.	1877–1883
	Sir Clement Courtenay Knollys, K.C.M.G.	1883–1894
	Sir George Ruthven Le Hunte, K.C.M.G.	1894–1897
	Sir Ralph Champneys Williams, K.C.M.G.	1897–1901
	Sir Francis James Newton K.C.M.G., C.V.O.	1901–1902
	Sir Samuel William Knaggs, K.C.M.G.	1903–1907
	Lord Ian Basil Gawaine Temple Hamilton-Temple-Blackwood	1907–1910
	Major Sir John Alder Burdon, K.B.E., C.M.G.	1910–1915
	Thomas Edward Fell, C.M.G.	1916–1919
	Lieutenant-Colonel Francis Jenkins, C.M.G.	1919–1921
	Sir Wilfrid Edward Francis Jackson, G.C.M.G.	1921–1926
	Douglas Roy Stewart, C.M.G.	1926–1931
	George Douglas Owen, C.M.G.	1931–1938
	Major William Henry Flinn, C.M.G., O.B.E.	1938–1942
	Sir Robert Christopher Stafford Stanley, K.B.E., C.M.G.	1942–1945
	Sir John Dalzell Rankine, K.C.M.G., K.C.V.O.	1945–1947
	Stewart Henry Perowne, O.B.E.	1947–1951
	Robert Noel Turner, C.M.G. Esq	1950–1956
	Jack Jesson Adie, C.M.G.	1957
	Guy Trayton Barton, C.M.G., O.B.E.	1958–1961

== See also ==
- List of governors of Barbados

== Sources ==
- British diplomats
