= Pertz =

Pertz is a surname. Notable people with the surname include:

- Dorothea Pertz (1859–1939), British botanist
- Georg Heinrich Pertz (1795–1876), German historian

== See also ==
- Rochelle Perts (born 1992), Dutch singer, winner of the talent show X Factor in 2011
- Pert (surname)
