= Samuel Knaggs =

British colonial administrator

Sir Samuel Knaggs KCMG
- Born: 25 December 1856; Old Swindon, Wiltshire, England
- Died: 31 December 1924 (aged 68); Barbados
- Occupation: Colonial administrator
- Spouse: Violet Grey Harragin (married 1893)
- Children: 5
- Parent(s): Robert and Eliza Knaggs

Sir Samuel William Knaggs KCMG (25 December 1856 – 31 December 1924) was a British colonial administrator.

== Biography ==
Knaggs was born in Old Swindon, Wiltshire, England, the second of the ten children of Robert Knaggs, a surgeon, and Harriet Eliza Knaggs (née Wright).

Knaggs was sent to the Royal College, Trinidad, and entered the Trinidad Civil Service in 1876. In 1886, he was the secretary of the commission inquiring into the road system. In 1897 he was Acting Commissioner for Tobago. He was appointed Chief Commissioner of Port of Spain in 1899 and Receiver-General for Trinidad in 1901. In 1902 he was Acting Colonial Secretary. In 1903 he was appointed Colonial secretary for Barbados and in 1907 for Trinidad and Tobago. He administered the Government of Trinidad and Tobago in 1907–1910, 1912–1913 and 1915–1916. He retired in January 1919.

Knaggs was appointed Companion of the Order of St Michael and St George (CMG) in 1908 and Knight Commander of the Order of St Michael and St George (KCMG) in the 1920 New Year Honours.

In 1893, Knaggs married Violet Grey Harragin and they had a son and four daughters. Ruth Knaggs was born on 8 September 1893 and Phyllis Knaggs on 22 November 1895. Kenneth John Knaggs was born on 9 January 1897 and was killed in action near Cambrai in France on 16 March 1918 while a Lieutenant in the 4th Battalion, Royal Warwickshire Regiment and attached to the Royal Flying Corps. Hilda Knaggs was born on 9 August 1898 and Dorothy on 10 October 1904.

Knaggs died at his residence in Barbados. His wife died on 28 February 1937 at 1 Perham Road, West Kensington, London, leaving an estate of £2,342.

== See also ==
- List of Colonial Secretaries of Barbados
- List of people from Swindon
