= Robert Turner (colonial administrator) =

British colonial administrator (1912–1987)

Robert Turner CMG SPDK
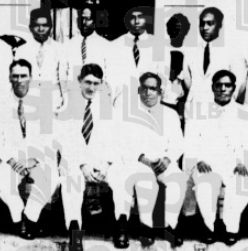
- Turner (seated, second left) as a cadet in the Malayan Civil Service in 1935

Chief Secretary of North Borneo
- In office 1956–1963

Chief Secretary of Barbados
- In office 1950–1956
- Preceded by: Stewart Henry Perowne
- Succeeded by: Jack Jesson Adie

Personal details
- Born: 28 December 1912
- Died: 18 January 1987 (aged 74)
- Children: 2
- Education: Wadham College, Oxford
- Occupation: Civil servant and colonial administrator

Robert Noel Turner (28 December 1912 – 18 January 1987) was a British colonial administrator who served as Chief Secretary of Barbados from 1950 to 1956 and Chief Secretary of North Borneo from 1956 to 1963.

== Early life and education ==
Turner was born on 28 December 1912, the son of A. Turner who was an engineer rear-admiral. He was educated at Dover College and Wadham College, Oxford where he took a first class degree in history.

== Career ==
Turner joined the Malayan Civil Service as a cadet in 1935, and served as officer in Kuala Pilah and in the Federal Secretariat in Kuala Lumpur in 1936, and then as assistant district officer at Teluk Anson in 1938. In 1940, he was seconded to Brunei as assistant resident, and in the following year, during the Japanese occupation of Borneo, he was interned by the Japanese, and remained in captivity in Kuching from December 1941 to September 1945. After the War, Turner was seconded to Sarawak where he served as assistant secretary. From 1948 to 1950, he served as Malayan establishment officer.

In 1950, Turner was appointed colonial secretary of Barbados (title changed to chief secretary in 1954), a post he held until 1956. From November 1952 to May 1953, and in 1955, he served as acting governor of Barbados and a member of the Legislative Council. In 1955, he received the commendation of the secretary of state for his efforts in coordinating the response to Hurricane Janet.

From 1956 to 1963, Turner served as the last chief secretary of North Borneo while also a member of the Executive and Legislative Councils. He worked with the United Nations Malaysia Mission established in 1963 to ascertain the wishes of the people of Sabah and Sarawak concerning the formation of the Federation of Malaysia. From 1963 to 1964, he served as state secretary of Sabah, Federation of Malaysia, while also a member of the state cabinet. He retired in 1964.

== Personal life and death ==
Turner married Evelyn Heynes Dupree in 1946 and they had two sons.

Turner died on 18 January 1987, aged 74.

== Honours ==
Turner was appointed Companion of the Order of St Michael and St George (CMG) in the 1955 New Year Honours. He was awarded first grade of the Order of Kinabalu (Seri Panglima Darjah Kinabalu) in 1965.
