= John Burdon =

Belizean politician

Burdon in 1930.

Major Sir John Alder Burdon KBE CMG (23 August 1866 – 9 January 1933) was Governor-General of British Honduras (now Belize) from 1925 to 1932. He also wrote Brief Sketch of British Honduras, Past, Present and Future (1927).

Born 23 August 1866 in Beijing, China, he was the son of Bishop John Shaw Burdon and Phoebe Esther Alder. He was educated in England, enlisting in the British Military in 1888 and served in the Cameron Highlanders. From 1903 to 1906, he served as the Resident of Sokoto Province in the Northern Nigeria Protectorate. By 1910 he was the Colonial Secretary of Barbados (Acting Governor 1910-11), and married Katherine Janet Sutherland 17 December 1910. He then served as Administrator of St. Kitts and Nevis (1916-1925) before his appointment as Governor-General of British Honduras from 1925 to 1932. He died on 9 January 1933, aged 66.

Burdon was appointed a Companion of the Order of St Michael and St George (CMG) in the 1904 Birthday Honours, and a Knight Commander of the Order of the British Empire (KBE) in the 1927 Birthday Honours.
