= DRC/CTB =

Publisher of educational assessment

- Company type: Publishing
- Founded: Los Angeles, California (1926)
- Founder: Ethel Clark
- Headquarters: 13490 Bass Lake Road; Maple Grove, MN, United States
- Area served: Worldwide
- Parent: Data Recognition Corporation (DRC)
- Website: CTB.com

DRC/CTB (CTB) was a publisher of educational assessment for the early learner, K–12, and adult basic education markets. DRC/CTB was a division of Data Recognition Corporation (DRC) until being fully merged into DRC's Educational Services division. From 1965 to 2015, the company was known as CTB/McGraw-Hill, a division of the McGraw-Hill companies, and prior to 1965 California Testing Bureau was an independent company.

CTB has published many assessments including California Achievement Tests (CAT), Tests of Basic Experiences (TOBE), and TerraNova.

== History ==
CTB was established in 1926 in Los Angeles by Ethel Clark. Clark's husband Willis had developed the Los Angeles Diagnostic Tests in the Fundamentals of Arithmetic, which she bought the rights to sell. She sent out 25 cent postcards advertising the availability of the test to various districts around the country. One year later, she heard from her first customer: the Kansas City school district. In 1960, the company relocated to Monterey, California, where the company headquarters was located until merged into DRC. In 1965, CTB was acquired by McGraw-Hill Education and became CTB/McGraw-Hill.

On June 30, 2015 McGraw-Hill Education announced that Data Recognition Corporation (DRC) had agreed to acquire "key assets" of the CTB/McGraw-Hill assessment business.

== Today ==
CTB serves more than 18 million students in all 50 states and 49 countries. CTB's current president is Ellen Haley. In 2002, CTB reportedly had a 40 percent share of the test design market, ranking second of the four major companies in the industry. In 2011 CTB acquired Bookette, a privately held software company. In June 2011, CTB celebrated its 85th anniversary.

== Tests ==
=== Current ===
- TerraNova: TerraNova is an assessment battery that was introduced in 1996. The first TerraNova assessment released in 1996 was a result of the updates of the California Achievement Tests and the California Test of Basic Skills. In 2006 CTB introduced TerraNova, Third Edition. TerraNova 3 was the first norm-referenced test (NRT).
- Tests of Adult Basic Education (TABE): Tests of Adult Basic Education (TABE) is an adult basic education assessment. TABE was introduced in 1967. In 2007, TABE–Complete Language Assessment System–English™(TABE CLAS–E™) was introduced.
- Test Assessing Secondary Completion (TASC): Test Assessing Secondary Completion (TASC) is a state-of-the-art affordable new national high school equivalency exam. TASC was introduced in 2013. It assesses five subject areas including Reading, Writing, Mathematics, Science, and Social Studies. It measures examinees' levels of achievement relative to that of graduating high school seniors, and career and college readiness, as outlined by the Common Core State Standards.
- LAS Links: LAS Links is a language proficiency assessment introduced in 1987.
- First Performances: First Performances is an assessment for early learners. It includes tests in concepts of letter and number.

=== Out of print ===
- California Achievement Tests: The California Achievement Tests (CAT) are among the most widely used tests of basic academic skills for children from kindergarten through grade 12. The most recent edition of the CAT (the sixth) is also called TerraNova, Third Edition (or alternately, TerraNova CAT ). The California Achievement Tests were introduced in 1934 as the Progressive Achievement Test. The test was renamed as the California Achievement Test in 1950 and was designed to individually diagnose student performance.
- Progressive Achievement Test: Introduced in 1933, the Progressive Achievement Test was the predecessor to the California Achievement Tests, and now TerraNova. It was authored by Drs. Ernest T. Tiegs and Willis W. Clark. The Progressive Achievement Test was considered to be one of the most reliable assessments of its time.
- The California Test of Mental Maturity (CTMM): Introduced in 1936, the California Test of Mental Maturity provided insight into mental traits of individual students. Authored by Drs. Elizabeth T. Sullivan, Willis W. Clark, and Ernest T. Tiegs, scores from the California Test of Mental Maturity are still valid as a qualifier for Mensa International® membership (qualifying test score is 132) and Intertel (qualifying minimum score of 137). Also, the Triple Nine Society accepts CTMM test results (qualifying score of 149).

== See also ==
- Psychometrics
