= J. Darius Bikoff =

American entrepreneur (born 1961)

- Born: John Darius Bikoff; September 21, 1961 (age 65); Queens, New York City, U.S.
- Education: Colgate University
- Occupations: Founder and CEO, Energy Brands
- Spouse: Jill Bikoff
- Children: 2
- Parent(s): William Bikoff; Suzie Bikoff

John Darius Bikoff (born September 21, 1961) is an American entrepreneur, founder and CEO of Energy Brands.

== Early life ==
Bikoff's father, William, was the owner of a real estate management company and was also a metals importer.

In 2007, Bikoff sold Energy Brands to the Coca-Cola Company for $4.1 billion. This deal earned Bikoff personally $325 million. The brand is known mostly for the product VitaminWater.

== Personal life ==
J. Darius and Jill Bikoff were married in 2003 and have two children.
