= Test Assessing Secondary Completion =

High school equivalency test (2014–2021)

The Test Assessing Secondary Completion, or TASC, was an alternative to a United States high school diploma, that was discontinued on December 31, 2021. It had been chosen by the states of New York and Indiana as a replacement for the GED exam, effective January 2, 2014.

The TASC was created by McGraw-Hill Education and administered by Data Recognition Corp. The test was composed of five subtests: Language Arts: Reading, Language Arts—Writing, Mathematics, Social Studies, and Science.

As of July 2016, the TASC was approved in 13 states in the US.

== See also ==
- HiSET
- GED
