= Prime editing-mediated readthrough of premature termination codons =

Genome editing strategy

PERT (Prime editing-mediated readthrough of premature termination codons)
- Specialty: Medical genetics, gene therapy, molecular biology
- Uses: Correction of nonsense mutations in genetic diseases
- Types: genome-editing technique
- [edit on Wikidata]

Prime editing-mediated readthrough of premature termination codons (PERT) is a genome-editing strategy that corrects nonsense mutations. The method converts non-essential endogenous transfer RNA (tRNA) into a suppressor tRNA. Upon translation this allows readthrough of premature stop codons. The mechanism targets the general molecular mechanism of ribosomal recognition of premature stop codons and is therefore described to be disease-independent. Prime editing is one of the three classes of genome-editing technologies in mammalian cells. The other two are CRISPR-associated nucleases and base editors.

== Principle of the method ==
Many genetic diseases, such as cystic fibrosis and Duchenne muscular dystrophy are caused by nonsense mutations in a gene. This causes the production of a non-functional protein via protein translation. PERT uses a method called prime editing. Small changes inside living cells can be made by programmable nickase fused to a polymerase and a small guide RNA. A recent review suggests functional outcomes should also be considered in context of the structural features of designed tRNA beyond anticodon changes.

== Development ==
PERT was first described in November 2025 in a "Nature" paper. A proof-of-concept study showed that the method is able to restore functional protein production in disease contexts such as cystic fibrosis.Prior research on suppressor tRNA has optimized the structural principles guiding PERT design

== Applications ==
PERT has been shown to restore protein production and function in cells and animal models. PERT has been proposed for gene therapy applications. PERT may be beneficial for larger patient cohorts since a single suppressor tRNA might be applicable across multiple diseases.
