= Wiesen Test of Mechanical Aptitude =

Mechanical reasoning test

The Wiesen Test of Mechanical Aptitude (WTMA) is among the most popular mechanical reasoning tests and is considered very reliable. The WTMA is a 30 minute, sixty-question test used to measure mechanical aptitude. It is used for employment testing of job applicants and to help select vocational education students. The WTMA assesses broad physical and mechanical concepts as well as one's ability to operate, maintain, and repair machinery. It is designed to assist employers in selecting candidates for employment, vocational students, and academic research. Additionally, it was designed to reduce gender, racial, and academic bias.

As in many standardized tests, the WTMA uses a multiple-choice format for its test questions. Each question contains a line drawing and a brief question together with three possible answers. Sample questions are available online. The questions on the Wiesen test, which are written at a sixth-grade reading level, do not require familiarity with objects encountered in specific events. Each question uses diagrams to illustrate mechanical principles. The questions found on the test are about the function, size, shape, appearance, and weight of common physical devices and tools.

The WTMA is used to assess the following:

- Concepts of basic machinery
- Movement of objects
- Gravity/center of gravity
- Heat conduction
- Basic electricity/electronics
- Basic physical properties of matter and materials

According to some reviews, the WTMA is the newest of mechanical aptitude tests and shows promise of being more fair to women than other such tests.
