= California High School Exit Exam =

Standardized test

The California High School Exit Examination (CAHSEE) was an examination created by the California Department of Education, that was previously mandated to administer in public high schools statewide in order to graduate. The examination was suspended in 2015, when Governor Jerry Brown signed a bill undoing the decade old requirement (the bill went into effect January 2016). It was originally created by the California Department of Education to improve the academic performance of California high school students, and especially of high school graduates, in the areas of reading, writing, and mathematics. In addition to other graduation requirements, public school students needed to pass the exam before they could receive a high school diploma.

Students first took the test in the beginning of their sophomore year. If they did not pass one or both of the two test sections, then they could retake the section or sections that they had not yet passed. Up to 2 test (or 8) opportunities were available to students before the end of their senior year.

The test was originally intended to be required of students graduating in 2004, but full implementation was delayed until the class of 2006. Approximately 90% of students ultimately passed by the end of the 2005-2006 school year. In 2010, 81% of 10th graders passed each of the two sections on their first try.

== History ==
Prior to the CAHSEE, the public high school exit exams in California were known as the High School Competency Exams and were developed by each district pursuant to California law. In 1999, California policy-makers voted to create the CAHSEE in order to have a state exam that was linked to the state’s new academic content standards. The legislative bill to create the CAHSEE was championed by former state senator Jack O'Connell. The first students to take the test were volunteers from the class of 2004, who took it as high school Freshmen in spring 2001 (March and May). In October 2001, Assembly Bill 1609 removed the option for ninth graders to take the CAHSEE beginning with the 2002 administration. The CAHSEE was next administered in the spring of 2002 to all tenth graders who had not passed it during the spring 2001 administration. Initially, the CAHSEE was intended as a graduation requirement for the class of 2004; the State Board of Education later revised the deadline and it was officially imposed first on the class of 2006. Due to controversy denying the graduation of students who failed, California Governor Jerry Brown signed a bill that suspended the exam and is no longer required for a diploma for students graduating twelfth grade until July 31, 2015.

== Composition ==
The CAHSEE was divided into two main sections: English-language arts (ELA) and mathematics.

The English section included about 80 multiple-choice questions and requires students to write one or two multi-paragraph essays.

The essay portion provided a question that prompts the student to write a persuasive essay, a business letter, a biography, a reaction to literature, or an analysis on the subject of the question. For example, in 2002, one group of students was asked to write an essay that persuaded people not to leave trash on the school grounds. Essay questions change with each test date. The essay portion was scaled out of one to four (with zeros given in special cases, such as for off-topic or non-English responses).

The mathematics section consisted of about 90 multiple choice questions.

The English section tested students at a 10th-grade level, and required a score of 60% to pass; the mathematics section tested students at an 8th-grade level, and required a score of 55% to pass.

== Results ==
Percentage of 10th graders passing the test on their first attempt
School year	Passing math test	Passing English test
2003–04	74%	75%
2004–05	74%	76%
2005–06	76%	77%
2006–07	76%	77%
2007–08	78%	79%
2008–09	80%	79%
2009–10	81%	81%
2010–11	83%	82%
2011–12	82%	79%
2012–13	85%	83%

The number of students passing the test on their first attempt had risen slightly each year since 2004. More than three-quarters of students passed the test more than two years before they finish high school, and more than nine out of ten students passed the test by the end of high school.

The passing rate of Asian and white students was higher than that of Hispanic and African-American students. Students learning English had the lowest passing rate, with one out of every four failing the exam in 2006.

Passing the test was first required for the Class of 2006. As of June 2007, 91% of the 404,000 students in this class had passed the test before graduation, 1% failed the exam in 2006 but passed it in 2007, and 4% were still in school, either as fifth-year seniors or having transferred to a community college.

As of February 2007, 91% of students in the Class of 2007 had passed both sections of the exit exam, an increase from the class of 2006.

== Special education ==
High school students with documented disabilities are allowed reasonable accommodations to keep those disabilities from being an unfair impediment toward proving academic competence. Tests administered with accommodations do not interfere with what the test was designed to measure or with the student's ability to earn a legitimate diploma. For example, a student with visual impairments may need a copy of the test in large-print or Braille. Students do not receive a diploma without obtaining the required minimum score on each test.

Anything interfering with what the test was itself originally intended to measure is considered a 'modification' (for example, reading a test aloud to the student, if the purpose of the test is to determine whether the student can read), nullifying the results for graduation purposes. (These test results are still included in the calculations concerning school performance measures.) Schools offer modified tests to students with disabilities to let them participate, to the extent reasonable, in the normal activities of the school.

Beginning with the Class of 2010, eligible disabled students may graduate without passing the California High School Exit Examination (CAHSEE). Eligible students have an Individualized Education Program (IEP) or Section 504 Plan that indicates that the student has satisfied or will satisfy all other state and local requirements to receive a high school diploma, except for passing the CAHSEE test. This exemption shall last until the State Board of Education either implements an alternative means for students with disabilities to demonstrate achievement in the standards measured by the CAHSEE or determines that an alternative means assessment to the CAHSEE is not feasible.

Students with disabilities are still required to take the CAHSEE in grade ten for purposes of fulfilling the requirements of the federal No Child Left Behind Act of 2001.

If a student has severe disabilities, an alternative test, the CAPA, can be given instead. This was intended to shorten the test for students whose chances of success on the CAHSEE were determined to be extremely low. There is no diploma granted under this condition, unless the student is exempted from needing to pass the actual CAHSEE.

== Effect on students ==
Many schools and districts allow students who had failed the exit exam, but met other graduation requirements, to participate in the public graduation ceremony, although they may not receive a valid diploma unless they qualify for exemption as a student with a serious disability. Some districts present these students with certificates of completion to recognize that they have met all other graduation requirements. The certificate of completion signifies completion of the required coursework and failure to meet the minimum standards set for either or both of the CAHSEE tests.

In the Los Angeles Unified School District, Superintendent Roy Romer allowed those who did not pass the CAHSEE to participate in graduation activities if the student agreed to take the CAHSEE during the summer.

== Criticism ==
The test has highlighted educational disparities by race, disability, income, and whether English is spoken in the home. This has been politically embarrassing for school districts, who were previously able to ignore their failures.

Though O'Connell, by then the state Superintendent of Public Instruction, resisted the political pressure for a delay, the state legislature granted students with previously documented learning disabilities a one-year reprieve in 2006.

In May 2006, an Alameda County Superior Court judge struck down the CAHSEE, ruling that students from disadvantaged schools, the majority of them with low income or recent immigrants, had not been appropriately prepared for the test. The California Department of Education appealed the ruling directly to the state Supreme Court, which reinstated the exam and upheld the CAHSEE.

Alternative assessments, such as evaluating students based on a portfolio of class work, have been proposed and rejected. Alternative assessments consider a greater range of student work, but being non-standardized assessments, they are more susceptible to bias in grading. They are also much more expensive to grade, and concerns have been raised about cheating, since a student could present work created in a completely unsupervised setting.

Supporters of the test say that since one in ten students fails the test, despite having passing grades, then receiving passing grades in California high schools does not indicate that the student has learned the material. School grades may instead represent rewards from teachers "for being friendly, prepared, compliant, a good school citizen, well organized and hard-working" rather than mastering the subject material.

== See also ==
- New York Regents Exam
- Standardized Testing and Reporting (STAR Test)
- Texas Assessment of Knowledge and Skills
- California High School Proficiency Exam
- High school graduation examination in the United States
- Bartleby Project
