= Energy Brands =

Coca-Cola Company subsidiary

Energy Brands Inc.
- Type: Subsidiary
- Industry: Beverage manufacturing and bottling
- Founded: May 22, 1996; 30 years ago
- Founders: J. Darius Bikoff; Mike Repole
- Headquarters: Whitestone, Queens, New York, United States
- Number of locations: 37
- Key people: Mike Repole (president); Mike Venuti (CFO); Carol Dollard (COO); Rohan Oza (CMO)
- Products: VitaminWater; SmartWater; VitaminWater10; VitaminWaterZero
- Revenue: US$350 million (2006)
- Number of employees: 750
- Parent: The Coca-Cola Company
- Website: drinksmartwater.com

Energy Brands Inc., doing business as Glacéau, is a privately owned subsidiary of the Coca-Cola Company based in Whitestone, Queens, New York, that manufactures and distributes various lines of drinks marketed as enhanced water. After founding the Glacéau Water Co. in January 1994, J. Darius Bikoff founded Energy Brands in May 1996 to distribute Glacéau's electrolyte enhanced line of water called Smartwater to health food stores and independent retailers in the New York area. Adding Fruitwater and Vitaminwater to its line in 1998 and 2000, respectively, the company expanded to nationwide distribution in the early 2000s.

By 2002, the Glacéau line of waters was the top-selling enhanced water brand in the United States, with the company's Vitaminwater being its best-selling product. In 2006, the company earned US$350 million in revenue. The company then began its global expansion, launching its products in the United Kingdom and Australia in 2008, France in 2009 and Argentina in 2011.

Energy Brands is owned primarily by Bikoff, employees, and small investors. Rapper 50 Cent obtained a minority share of the company as part of an endorsement deal in the company. Thirty percent of the equity was sold to LVMH sometime in the 2000s, which in turn sold those shares. The shares eventually were sold to India-based Tata Group in August 2006, which held the shares until May 2007 when the Coca-Cola Company purchased the company as an independent subsidiary, leaving its actual operations with its existing management including Bikoff.

== History ==
J. Darius Bikoff, a self-proclaimed health nut born on September 21, 1961, first conceived of the idea of vitamin-enhanced water in 1994. According to him, he was feeling "run down" and concerned he was catching a cold, so he took some Vitamin C and drank some mineral water. As he consumed the items, he started thinking about the idea of having them together instead of having to take them separately. He founded Energy Brands on May 22, 1996 using his personal savings and contracting with an aquifer in Connecticut for the base water used. The individual products used the existing Glacéau brand, which itself was founded by Bikoff in January 1994. The first product distributed by Energy Brands was Glacéau Smartwater.

Reflecting on the company's early history, Bikoff notes that it was "very tough" as he struggled with founding the company having no actual experience in beverage manufacturing, beyond working in an aluminum fabrication factory. While launching his company, he was also having to deal with personal struggles including a divorce and having to file for bankruptcy. He started by personally introducing Smartwater to smaller independent natural food stores around New York, moving to a statewide launch when the product became successful. He used this same basic method, adding in "mom-and-pop stores", for the launches of Fruitwater and Vitaminwater in 1998 and 2000, respectively. By 2001, the company's drinks were sold in over 4,000 retail stores in the New York area. According to Bikoff, this enabled his products to go unnoticed by the large beverage makers until the product was firmly established, when he could then cultivate relationships with various independent distributors, opening the way for nationwide distribution.

Bikoff eventually allowed LVMH to buy a 30% equity share in the company. LVMH later sold the stake to another investor, who in turn sold it again. The shares ended up in the hands of India-based Tata Group in August 2006, which paid $677 million for the 30% equity, seeking to expand its American business interests.

=== Acquisition by Coca-Cola ===
On May 25, 2007, the company was acquired by the Coca-Cola Company for $4.1 billion in cash.

$1.2 billion of the sales went to the Tata Group for its 30% minority ownership, which Tata agreed to sell. Under the purchase agreement, Energy Brands remains nearly autonomous as a subsidiary of Coca-Cola, with Coca-Cola primarily operating with a hands-off method, leaving Bikoff and Energy Brands principal operating officers in charge. In discussing the role of Coca-Cola, Bikoff states: "We run independently, we have our own offices. If Coca-Cola don't call me, I don't call them."

Energy Brands began launching its products in the United Kingdom and Australia in 2008, with France following in 2009 and Argentina in 2011. The company eventually plans to expand to Canada and Mexico.

=== Legal disputes ===
On April 5, 2006, Energy Brands filed a lawsuit against PepsiCo in the U.S. District Court in Manhattan alleging that PepsiCo's SoBe "Life Water" packages infringed its trade dress for similar drinks. In the subsequent settlement Pepsi agreed to change its packaging.

On January 14, 2009, the Center for Science in the Public Interest filed a class-action lawsuit against Energy Brands' parent company in the Northern District of California Court. The suit alleges that the marketing of the drink as a "healthful alternative" to soda is deceptive and in violation of Food and Drug Administration guidelines. The consumer group states that "according to CSPI nutritionists, the 33 grams of sugar in each bottle of Vitaminwater do more to promote obesity, diabetes and other health problems than the vitamins in the drinks do to perform the advertised benefits listed on the bottles". Coca-Cola dismissed the allegations as "ridiculous," on the grounds that "no consumer could reasonably be misled into thinking Vitaminwater was a healthy beverage" and an attempt by the group to increase its readership.

In 2011, the Judicial Panel on Multidistrict Litigation ordered the coordination of different lawsuits against Coca-Cola Co. that alleged it misled the public about the nutritional benefits of Vitaminwater.

== Business model ==
=== Financials ===
As a privately owned company, Energy Brands has never been required to release information about its sales figures or other financial information. Bikoff himself never stated what percentage of the company he owned before it was sold. Forbes magazine once reported that he owned only 25% of the company, but in an interview with The Times, he denied this stating: "Did anyone say I had less than 50%? Look, I maintained control of the company and I maintain it today. But I don't talk about my share as every story becomes one about personal wealth." In 2006, the company was reported to have an annual sales revenue of $350 million.

Before the sale to Coca-Cola, 70% shares of the company were held by company employees and smaller investors, with 30% held by the Tata Group. In October 2004, rapper Curtis Jackson—known as 50 Cent—was given a minority share in the company in exchange for becoming a spokesperson after learning that he was a fan of the beverage. The health-conscious Jackson noted that he first learned of the product while at a gym in Los Angeles, and stated that "they do such a good job making water taste good." After becoming a shareholder and endorser, Jackson worked with the company to create a new grape-flavored "Formula 50" variant of Vitaminwater and mentioned the drinks in various songs and interviews. It's unknown how much Jackson made from the purchase of his shares by Coca-Cola, with estimates in the financial press mainly in the $100 – 400million range. Though he no longer has an equity stake in the company, Jackson continues to act as a spokesperson for Vitaminwater, enthusiastically supporting the product, including singing about it at the BET Awards and expressing his excitement over the company's continuing to allow his input on products.

=== Products ===
Energy Brands' first product was Glacéau Smartwater, vapor-distilled water with added electrolytes, which was released at the company's launch in 1996. Glacéau Fruitwater, adding zero-calorie fruit flavors to the core Smartwater, followed in 1998. In 2000, Vitaminwater was launched, adding vitamins and natural flavors with Smartwater. Designed to "fill the gap" between soft drinks and water for people who knew they should be drinking more water but weren't, Vitaminwater was targeted primarily at adults. With fewer calories than soda, the company states that the drink both hydrates consumers and provides nutrients they are likely to be missing.

In 2002, Energy Brands' Glacéau drinks were the top-selling brand of enhanced water. Vitaminwater is considered its most successful of the four products. On April 2, 2009, Glacéau Vitaminwater introduced a new line for the weight-conscious market called Vitaminwater10 that has 10 calories per eight-ounce serving, and later Vitaminwater Zero, a calorie-free drink, down from the older line that serves 50 kilocalories. Both drinks include Truvia as a sweetener. Vitaminwater Zero also used Erythritol until March 2023, when two new flavors, coconut lime and raspberry dark chocolate, were announced along with a change to stevia and monk fruit as sweeteners. In September 2010, a rebranded version of the 10 calorie drink was introduced to the Canadian market, although Vitaminwater Zero is still exclusively a US product.

== Vitaminwater ==
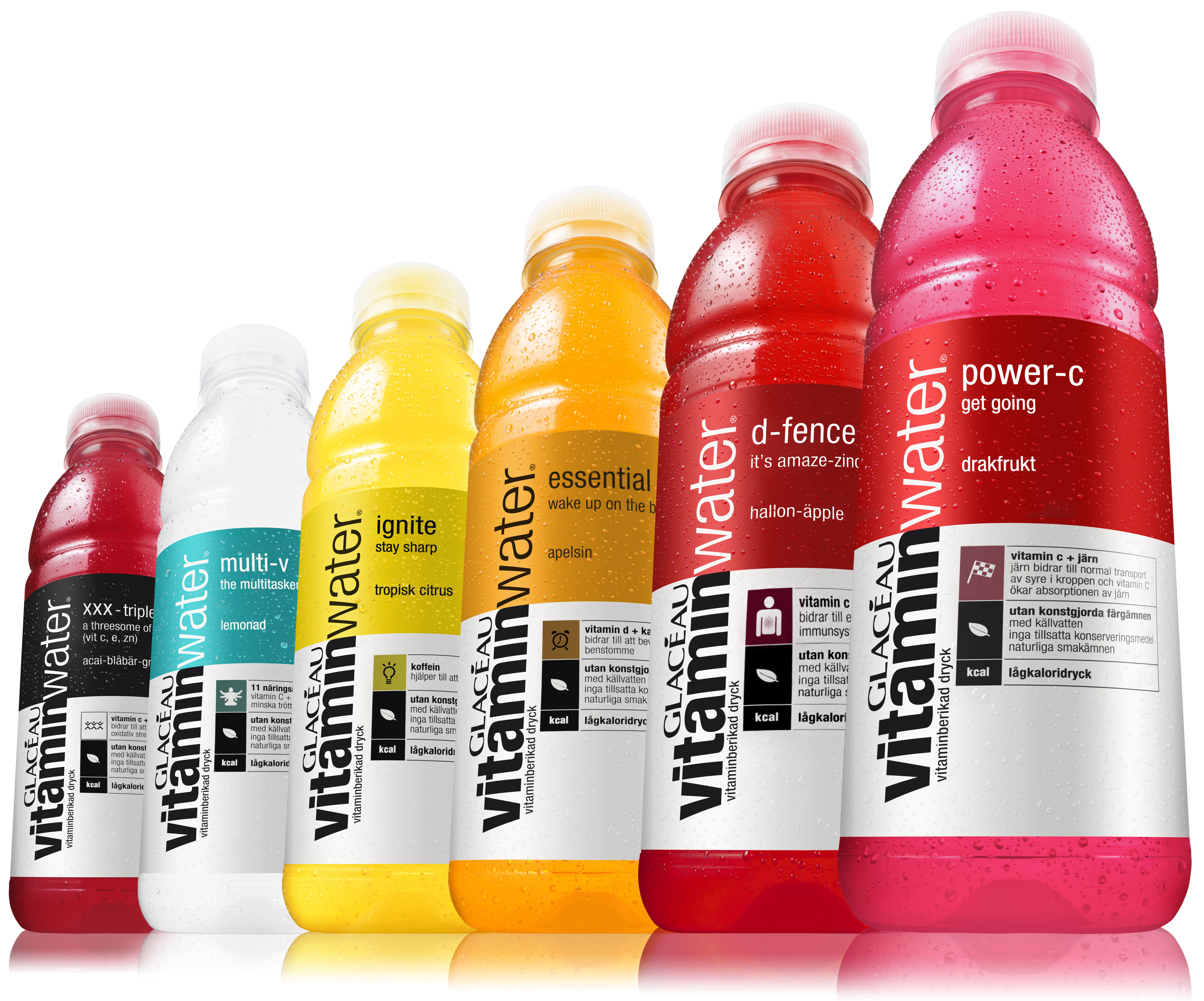
Six different flavors of vitaminwater

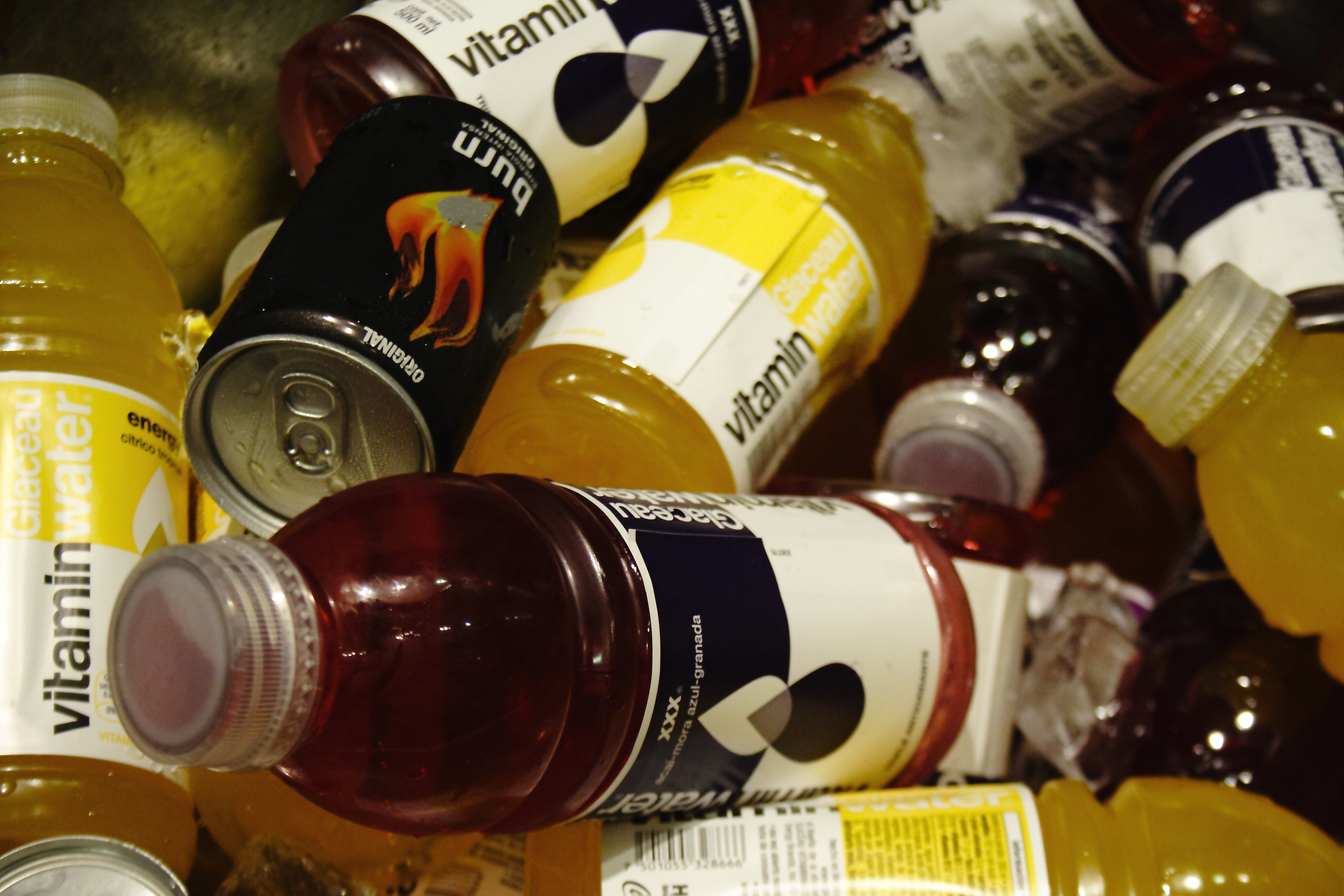
vitaminwater and Burn

Vitaminwater, stylized as vitaminwater, is a mineral water product distributed by Energy Brands, introduced in 2000. Some ingredients are added according to the flavor and intended purpose of the drink.

=== Misleading advertising ===
In 2008, the Australian consumer organisation Choice gave one of its annual 'Shonky' awards to vitaminwater, saying that, despite the claim that the drinks were healthy, "one bottle contains about a third of the recommended daily sugar intake for an average adult woman ... and none contains more than 1% fruit juice". Choice also noted that the label on one flavour blatantly mocked food regulations designed to protect consumers by stating, "We are prohibited from making exaggerated claims about the potency of the nutrients in this bottle", before making exaggerated claims about the potency of the nutrients in the bottle.

In 2009, brand owner the Coca-Cola Company was sued by the Center for Science in the Public Interest. The suit alleged that the marketing of the drink as a "healthful alternative" to soda is deceptive and in violation of Food and Drug Administration guidelines. The consumer group stated that "according to CSPI nutritionists, the 33 grams of sugar in each bottle of Vitaminwater do more to promote obesity, diabetes and other health problems than the vitamins in the drinks do to perform the advertised benefits listed on the bottles". Coca-Cola criticized the suit as "ridiculous" because "no consumer could reasonably be misled into thinking Vitaminwater was a healthy beverage" and that the suit was an attempt by the group to increase its readership. In 2013, a federal judge ruled that the lawsuit could move forward as a class-action lawsuit.

In January 2011, the United Kingdom's Advertising Standards Authority (ASA) ruled that an advertisement that claimed vitaminwater was "nutritious" was misleading due to the high sugar content (23 g per 500 ml) of the drink. The ruling banning the advertisement stated: "Because Vitamin water contained about a quarter of a consumer's GDA (guideline daily amount) for sugar as well as the added vitamins, we considered that the description of Vitamin water as 'nutritious' was misleading".

=== Flavors ===
List of Vitaminwater flavors
Color	Label	Flavor	Vitamins and other additives
	Power-C	dragonfruit	C, taurine
	Elevate	blue raspberry limeade	
	Energy	tropical citrus	B, guarana, C, electrolytes, caffeine
	Focus	kiwi-strawberry	C, B5, B6, B12
	XXX	acai-blueberry pomegranate	vitamin B, C, triple antioxidants
	Essential	orange-orange	C, calcium
	Refresh	tropical mango	E, B5, B6, B12, electrolytes, C
	Rise (Zero)	orange	B3, B5, B6, B12, C, electrolytes
	Re-Hydrate (Zero)	pineapple passionfruit	B6, B12, C, E, niacin, pantothenic acid, magnesium
	Squeezed (Zero)	lemonade	A, C, E, Vitamin B6, calcium, biotin, magnesium, zinc, selenium, pantothenic acid
	XXX (Zero)	acai-blueberry pomegranate	B6, B12, C, A, niacin, pantothenic acid, selenium, manganese
	Shine (Zero)	strawberry lemonade	B5, B6, B12, A, C, E, biotin, pantothenic acid
	Focus (Zero)	kiwi-strawberry	C, B5, B6, B12
	Power-C (Zero)	dragonfruit	C, B5, B6, B12, zinc, chromium, taurine
	Gutsy (Zero)	watermelon peach	B3, B5, B6, B12
	Forever You (Zero)	coconut lime with white circumin	A, C, E, B3, B5, B6, B12, electrolytes
	With Love (Zero)	raspberry dark chocolate	magnesium, A, C, E, B3, B5, B6, B12, electrolytes

=== Discontinued flavors ===
- Balance - cran-grapefruit
- B-Relaxed – jackfruit-guava
- Breeze-E – strawberry watermelon
- Defense – raspberry-apple
- Drive – blood-orange mixed-berry
- Endurance – peach-mango
- Fire - spicy watermelon
- Formula 50 – grape
- Glow - strawberry-guanabana
- Go-Go (Zero) - mixed berry
- Ice (Zero) - cool blueberry lavender
- Perform – lemon-lime
- Power-C – acerola
- Rescue - green tea
- Reset (Zero) - pineapple coconut
- Revive – fruit punch
- Revive (Zero) – fruit punch
- Spark - grape-blueberry
- Stress-B – lemon-lime
- Squeezed – lemonade
- Stur-D - blue agave-passionfruit-citrus
- Tranquilo – tamarind-pineapple
- Vital–T – lemon tea

== Smartwater ==
Smartwater is vapor-distilled water with electrolytes added for taste. It was introduced in 1990 as Glacier Mineral Water and was renamed Smartwater in 1996. It is available in 600 mL, 700 mL, 850 mL, 1 L, 1.5 L, and 20 oz bottles.

Jennifer Aniston was the spokesperson of the brand from 2007 to 2020, being succeeded by Gal Gadot. In June 2022, Zendaya was announced as the new ambassador, replacing Gadot.

== Vitaminenergy ==
Vitaminenergy, stylized as vitaminenergy, is an energy drink which consists of many of the same ingredients as vitaminwater, such as crystalline fructose (a sugar), electrolytes, natural flavors, and vitamins (Vitamin B3, B5, B6, B12, and C) along with natural caffeine and ribose. Specific ingredients are added according to the flavor of the drink. Either 16 oz, 200 calories and 150 mg caffeine per can, or 2 oz, no calories. The vitaminenergy website does not show ingredients or amount of caffeine for the 'shot' product.

=== Flavors ===
- Dragonfruit
- Tropical Citrus
- Fruit Punch

== Fruitwater ==
Fruitwater, stylized as fruitwater, was a less sweetened, sparkling version of Vitaminwater drink that was sold from 2013 to 2015. It consisted of the same ingredients only with a light fruit flavor and less crystalline fructose. Aside from "natural flavor," fruitwater does not contain any actual fruit juice. Ingredients include Guarana seed, which has twice as much caffeine as coffee. Coca-Cola discontinued the drink in 2015 due to poor sales.

=== Flavors ===
- Black Raspberry
- Strawberry Kiwi
- Lemon-Lime
- Orange Mango
- Watermelon Punch
