= Pharmacy College Admission Test =

- Acronym: PCAT
- Type: Computer-based standardized test
- Purpose: Admissions to pharmacy colleges principally in the United States and Canada
- Year started: 1974
- Duration: 3 hours 25 minutes + Rest Break
- Score range: 200–600
- Languages: English
- Fee: US$210.00
- Used by: Pharmacy colleges principally in the United States and Canada
- Website: pcatweb.info

The Pharmacy College Admission Test (PCAT) was a computer-based standardized test administered to prospective pharmacy school students by Pearson Education, Inc as a service for the American Association of Colleges of Pharmacy (AACP); it is offered in January, July, and September. The test is divided into five sections to be taken in approximately three and a half hours. The test includes Writing, Biology, Chemistry, Critical reading, and Quantitative Reasoning sections. The composite score is based on the multiple-choice sections, and can range from 200 – 600. There is no passing score; pharmacy schools set their own standards for acceptable scores. Calculators are not allowed during the testing period and no penalty is given for incorrect answers.

The test was retired effective January 10, 2024.

== See also ==
- List of admissions tests
- American Association of Colleges of Pharmacy
