= GST admission test =

Standardized test in Bangladesh for university admission

GST Admission Test (GST–General, Science & Technology; also known as Guccha/Ghuccho admission test) is an annual-integrated admission system in Bangladesh. At present, the eligibility for admission in 19 general and science and technology universities is verified through this test. The first GST examination was held in 2021 for university admission phase in the 2020–2021 academic year. In 2024 admission phase, more than 300 thousand students applied to take the test.

Admission tests for seven agriculture-based universities in Bangladesh, which are outside the GST (General, Science, and Technology) process, are conducted through an agriculture cluster system. Similarly, admission tests for engineering and technology universities are held under the "Engineering Cluster" (প্রকৌশল গুচ্ছ). Four autonomous universities, which were established before independence and operate under a 1973 ordinance, as well as BUET (Bangladesh University of Engineering and Technology) and a few specialized universities, are outside this cluster process. However, the Bangladesh government and UGC (University Grants Commission) have expressed their intentions to implement a unified admission test for all public universities.
