= Basic Elementary Skills Test =

Proficiency test in mathematics and language skills

The Basic Elementary Skills Test (BEST) is a test used to verify the ability of children in mathematics and English (writing, reading, and spelling). Currently the test is available in Cambodian, Chinese, Persian, Vietnamese, Arabic, and Spanish.

== Different sub-tests ==
The reading test requires the child to read a list of words as quickly as possible. The writing test examines the ability of the child to write sentences or paragraphs based on their age. The mathematics sub-test involves identifying numbers and solving simple problems. In the spelling test the child's ability to spell words correctly is measured.

== Scoring marks ==
Marks are awarded for each correct answer, except for writing test where points are taken away for making mistakes and more points are earned for longer sentences. The raw marks are converted to approximate grade levels which are then used to determine if the child needs intervention classes.
