= Edward Peart =

English physician

- Born: 1756?
- Died: November 1824
- Occupation: Medical doctor

Edward Peart (1756? – November 1824) was an English medical doctor.

== Biography ==
Peart was born around 1756. He was an M.D. and a corresponding member of the London Medical Society. He practised for some time at Knightsbridge, but afterwards removed to Butterwick, near Gainsborough, Lincolnshire, where he wrote on numerous scientific topics. He was chiefly known for his works on physical and chemical theory, which involved him in polemics with the critical magazines. Although an acute critic both of Joseph Priestley and Antoine Lavoisier, he failed to grasp the distinction made by the latter chemist between ponderable matter and caloric, and hence his constructive theories, though ingenious, were unsound and sterile, and discredited his criticisms. Peart in his ‘Animal Heat’ (1788) explained all chemical and physical phenomena by assuming the existence of four elements—æther, phlogiston, the acid principle, and earth. In the following year these were reduced to three, two active principles, æther and phlogiston, and one fixed. When a fixed particle is surrounded by an atmosphere of particles of æther radiating from it in straight lines, it forms an earthy (i.e. alkaline) particle; a phlogiston atmosphere producing an acid particle (The Elementary Principles of Nature, pp. 24, 285). All actions ‘at a distance,’ corresponding to the phenomena of electricity, magnetism, and gravitation, are explained by means of these ‘atmospheres.’ The least fantastic of Peart's books are those on physiology and medicine. In his ‘Animal Heat’ Peart revives the idea of John Mayow that animal combustion takes place in the substance of the muscle and not in the lung, as Lavoisier thought. In the same book he sees clearly that the constant temperature of animals in exercise and at rest must be due to a correlation of various functions, and investigates the matter experimentally in a somewhat rough way. The formula ‘excitability of the muscular fibres is the great characteristic of life in animals’ (loc. cit. p. 91) is still accepted. In his medical works he shows himself untrammelled by the school teaching of his day, and his independent observation of nature should have exerted a useful influence on his contemporaries. He used simple drugs, and ascribed their beneficial effects to direct action on the materies morbi of the disease. Peart declares (On the Composition of Water, p. 67), ‘I write for amusement at my leisure hours,’ and (Physiology, preface, p. xiii) ‘I have no expectation of making converts to my peculiar views.’ He seems to have made none. From his writings, and in spite of his controversies, Peart appears as a man of kindly though erratic tendencies. In his ‘Physiology’ (p. 280) and elsewhere he vigorously protests against the unnecessary vivisections of his time.

Peart died at Butterwick in November 1824.

The following is a list of Peart's works:

- ‘The Generation of Animal Heat,’ 1788.
- ‘The Elementary Principles of Nature,’ 1789.
- ‘On Electricity,’ 1791.
- ‘On the Properties of Matter, the Principles of Chemistry,’ &c., 1792.
- ‘On Electric Atmospheres [with] a Letter to Mr. Read of Knightsbridge,’ 1793.
- ‘The Antiphlogistic Doctrine … critically examined … [with] Strictures on Dr. Priestley's Experiments on the Generation of Air from Water,’ 1795.
- ‘On the Composition and Properties of Water, with a Review of Mrs. Fulhame's Essay on Combustion,’ 1796.
- ‘Physiology,’ 1798.
- ‘On Malignant Scarlet Fever and Sore Throat,’ 1802.
- ‘On Erysipelas and Measles,’ 1802.
- ‘On Rheumatism, Inflammation of the Eyes,’ &c., 1802.
- ‘On Inflammation of the Bowels,’ 1802.
- ‘On Consumption of the Lungs,’ 1803.
