= Pert (sidewheeler) =

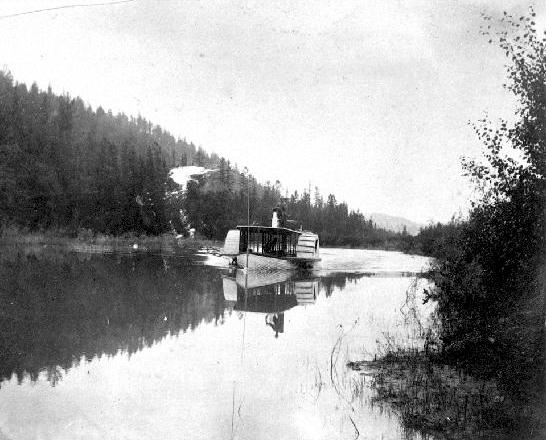
- Pert

History
- Name: Pert
- Owner: Upper Columbia Navigation & Tramway Co.
- Port of registry: Canada
- Route: Inland British Columbia on the Columbia River in the Columbia Valley
- Builder: Fred Wells
- Out of service: Abandoned 1905
- Identification: CAN #107826
- Fate: Abandoned 1905

General characteristics
- Type: inland passenger/freighter
- Tonnage: 6.5 gross tons; 4 registered tons
- Length: 50 ft (15 m)
- Beam: 10 ft (3 m)
- Depth: 2.6 ft (1 m) depth of hold
- Installed power: unpowered bateau 1887–1890; converted to sidewheel and first steam engine installed 1890, details unknown; second engine installed 1900: high-pressure single-cylinder vertically mounted 5-inch bore by 6-inch stroke, 6.44 nominal horsepower, built by Albion Iron Works.
- Propulsion: sidewheels

Pert was a steam-powered vessel that operated in British Columbia on the Columbia River from 1887 to 1905, often transporting large loads of timber. Pert was also referred to as Alert and City of Windermere during her service. The vessel was originally constructed as an unpowered boat but was later converted to be a steam-powered sidewheeler and then a screw propeller.

Pert was built in 1887 by shipwright Fred Wells as an unpowered river vessel named "Alert." Ownership of the vessel was later transferred to Captain Frank P. Armstrong of the Upper Columbia River Navigation & Tramway Company. In 1890, the vessel was retrofit with an engine and side wheels and renamed "Pert." Under Cpt. Armstrong, Pert worked regularly on Columbia Lake until 1898 when she was sold to Captain Alex Blakely. Cpt. Blakely had her sidewheels and motor replaced with a propeller and a single piston engine. Her namesake was then changed for the second time to "City of Windmere." The vessel was abandoned on Columbia Lake in 1905.

== Design and construction ==
Pert was built at Golden, British Columbia, by Fred Wells, who named the vessel Alert. The vessel seems to have been originally built as a bateau, that is, an unpowered river vessel propelled by oars or by poling along the river. An engine and sidewheels were installed in 1890.

== Operations ==
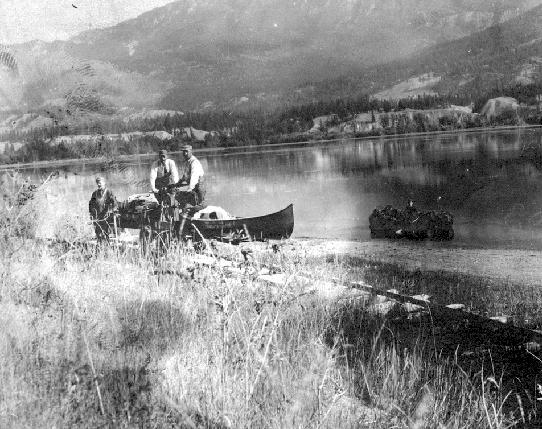
The tramway at Columbia Lake

In 1891, Capt. Frank P. Armstrong started operating Pert as part of his steamboat line, the Upper Columbia Navigation & Tramway Co. (UCN&T) to operate on the headwaters of the Columbia River above Golden, an area which is known as the Columbia Valley. From 1892 to 1898, Armstrong ran Pert on Columbia Lake.

=== Use on Columbia Lake ===
The river flowing out of Columbia Lake was often too shallow for a steamboat, and so UCN&T built a mule or horse-drawn tramway extending to the northern end of Columbia Lake. Cargoes bound south to the valley of the upper Kootenay River would be loaded on the tramway, and pulled to the wharf on the lake, then loaded on Pert. The steamboat would then paddle south across the lake to the portage at Canal Flats. The cargo would then be unloaded and portaged over to the Kootenay River. When Pert was running on the river, a canal and lock connected Columbia Lake with the Kootenay River. The canal was not much used; only three steamboat transits were ever made.

=== Sale ===
In 1898 Armstrong sold Pert to Capt. Alex Blakely, who rebuilt the vessel into a propeller-driven towboat with a new name, City of Windermere. In 1903, Blakely sold it to Capt. E.N. Russell, who changed the vessel's name back to Pert and ran her on Windermere Lake and the upper Columbia River from 1903 to 1905.

== Abandonment ==
Pert was abandoned in 1905 on Windermere Lake.
