= TACHS test =

The Test for Admission into Catholic High Schools or TACHS (pronounced tax) is the admissions test for Catholic high schools in and around New York City. First used in the autumn of 2004, the test allows schools to compare students' academic abilities, including how a student performs under pressure. Some schools use it to help determine which students will receive a scholarship

== Format ==
The exam tests many of the same academic skills as the COOP and HSPT exams. The test is also very similar to the TerraNova tests which are given every year to NY school students in early October. The major areas that are covered on the TACHS are reading, language, mathematics, and general reasoning ability skills.

=== Administration ===
Every year the TACHS test normally takes place in early November, with the results coming back in January and February. The test is administered to grade 8 students for admission into the next year's freshman class.

=== Application ===
Students are limited to applying to three high schools. Part of registration includes entering the TACHS school code for the schools the student wishes to send scores to. Scores can be forwarded to Archdiocese of New York (New York City & Westchester), Diocese of Brooklyn (Brooklyn & Queens), and Diocese of Rockville Centre (Long Island) high schools, as well as certain independent schools.

=== Mathematics ===
The mathematics section of the test focuses on several math categories. The math problems include Integers, Fractions, Decimals, Percents, Algebra, Plane Geometry, Polygons, Circles, Measurements, Graphs and Tables, Word Problems, Sequences, and Analogies.

=== Ability ===
The ability section of the test focuses on the student's ability to find patterns and sequences that can be used for a higher purpose in the future.

=== Verbal Skills ===
The verbal skills tested on in this test are not only featured in the TACHS, but also in other standardized tests such as the SAT, ACT, GRE, etc. The verbal skills section of the test includes: Word Roots, World Lists, Synonyms and Antonyms, Verbal Reasoning, and so forth.

== Sources ==
- http://www.barronstestprep.com
- Barron's: How to Prepare for the COOP/HSPT/TACHS, Kathleen Elliott, M.A., Carmen Geraci, M.A., David Ebner, Ph.D.
