= Postsecondary Education Readiness Test =

The Postsecondary Education Readiness Test (PERT) is a computer adaptive test which measures a student's level of preparedness for college-level courses. The test is currently being used by all Florida high schools and the 28 members of the Florida College System. The PERT was created by McCann Associates in cooperation with Florida educators. The test is divided into three sections: Mathematics, Reading, and Writing.

== History ==
Florida Section 1008.30 of the Florida Statutes, first implemented in 1992 by the Florida Legislature, required the State Board of Education to create and implement a common placement-testing program to determine the readiness of students to enter a degree program at any public college or university. In October 2010, the Florida Department of Education's Division of Florida Colleges implemented one of the first customized college placement tests developed by a team of K-12 and college faculty. The process began in April 2008, when, on the recommendation of the Go Higher Florida! task force and with the support of Commissioner Eric Smith, Florida joined Achieve's American Diploma Project network. In September 2008, as an initial step in aligning high school exit and college entry expectations, the Division of Florida Colleges held a workshop for English/language arts and mathematics K-20 faculty from across the state.

The participants reviewed the American Diploma Project (ADP) benchmarks, identifying the competencies they deemed critical to college readiness in entry-level math and English and locating the gaps between academic preparation in the schools and postsecondary expectations. This endeavor resulted in Florida's Postsecondary Readiness Competencies (PRCs), which were then aligned with the K-12 Sunshine State Standards through a joint effort between the department and Achieve.

The Postsecondary Readiness Competencies then drove the specifications for a new statewide college placement test. Members of the original faculty pool that identified the PRCs reconvened in April 2009 to develop test items for each of the English/language arts and math sections. These faculty experts chose items that covered each competency, ensuring that the items chosen were representative of the knowledge that incoming college freshmen needed to possess in order to be successful in entry-level college courses without the need for remediation. The PRCs and the exemplar items were included in information provided to potential vendors, who were invited to submit sample test questions based upon the work of the faculty.

All submitted proposals were reviewed by three separate review committees: a content review team, a technical review team, and a negotiation team. The faculty from the original working group that had identified the critical competencies and developed the exemplars were called upon to staff the content review team. They were charged with reviewing and rating the vendor's sample questions for item alignment and item quality. In January 2010, Scott Kramer announced the test-development contract was awarded to McCann Associates, an assessment provider experienced in working with both the College Board and ACT.

In June 2010, Florida colleges administered over 10,000 pilot exams populated with the newly created test items. The data from the pilot was then used to build the PERT item bank. On October 25, 2010, the PERT went live. Each college in the Florida College System is now in the process of transitioning to it as their primary placement assessment.

== Function ==
McCann Associates states the PERT is Florida's new common placement exam designed to test the core competencies of math, reading, and writing required for college admission. McCann Associates developed the PERT series in direct consultation with the Florida Department of Education's Division of Florida Colleges and Florida postsecondary faculty to accurately and adaptively place students on the proper track for success.

== Use ==
A student cannot fail the PERT. Scores are used to determine whether a student is ready for college level coursework. For those who do not meet the state established cut score, the score is an indicator that additional preparation is necessary before entering college level courses. For high school students who do not meet the college-ready cut score on the PERT, the high school must offer those students postsecondary preparatory instruction. Each school district is permitted to set their own testing schedule.

== Format ==
The PERT is divided into three subsections: Mathematics, Reading and Writing. Each section consists of 25 operational items (basis of the student's placement score) and 5 field test items used to continuously enhance the operational test bank. The test is untimed. Students are not permitted to bring calculators to the testing area, however a calculator will appear on screen for math questions.

Whether taking the PERT in high school or for college placement, students are only permitted two opportunities to take the test. Preparing for the test, understanding the type of questions, and being confident in knowledge of the material can greatly benefit the test taker. Achieving the cut score in high school will allow student to proceed with dual enrollment and keep them from taking additional classes during their senior year. At the college level, achieving the cut score will allow the student to proceed directly into courses that earn credits towards their degree. Taking a certified PERT Practice Test can increase understanding of the test style, highlight deficient areas for study, decrease test day anxiety, and allow for better scores when it counts. There are a number of resources for PERT practice test and test tips, PERT related videos and PERT information.

=== Mathematics ===
- Equations – solving linear equations, linear inequalities, quadratic equations, and literal equations
- Evaluating algebraic expressions
- Polynomials – factoring, simplifying, adding, subtracting, multiplying, and dividing
- Dividing by monomials and binomials
- Applying standard algorithms or concepts
- Coordinate planes – translate between lines and inspect equations
- Focusing on pairs of simultaneous linear equations in two variables

=== Reading ===
- Discerning and summarizing the most important ideas, events, or information
- Supporting or challenging assertions about the text
- Determining the meaning of words and phrases in context
- Analyzing the meaning, word choices, tone, and organizational structure of the text
- Distinguishing between facts and opinions
- Evaluating reasoning and rhetoric of an argument or explanation

=== Writing ===
- Sustaining focus on a specific topic or argument
- Establishing a topic or thesis
- Demonstrating the conventions of standard written English including grammar, usage, and mechanics
- Supporting and illustrating arguments and explanations
- Developing and maintaining a style and tone
- Synthesizing information from multiple relevant sources
- Conveying complex information clearly and coherently
- Representing and accurately citing data, conclusions, and opinions of others
- Establishing a substantive claim and acknowledging competing arguments or information
- Conceptual and organizational skills – recognizing effective transitional devices within the context of a passage
- Word choice skills – recognizing commonly confused or misused words and phrases
- Sentence structure skills – using modifiers correctly, using coordination and subordination effectively, recognizing parallel structure
- Grammar, spelling, capitalization, and punctuation skills – avoiding inappropriate shifts in verb tense and pronouns; maintaining agreement between pronoun and antecedent; and using proper case forms, adjectives, and adverbs

Students who do not score the minimum, or "cut score", on the test will be required to take a class during 12th grade for additional learning. During the class, teachers will offer focused instruction to ensure students are learning the skills necessary to improve their scores and be successful after graduation.
