= Veterinary College Admission Test =

US veterinary school examination

The Veterinary College Admission Test, often called the VCAT, was a former veterinary school admissions examination. Depending on the school, pre-veterinary students usually take the Graduate Record Examinations (GRE) or the Medical College Admission Test (MCAT) for entrance to schools now.
