= Bob Peart =

English footballer

Personal information
- Full name: Robert Charles Peart
- Date of birth: 17 December 1926
- Place of birth: Swindon, England
- Date of death: 22 December 1966 (aged 40)
- Place of death: Swindon, England
- Position: Centre forward

Senior career*
Years	Team	Apps	(Gls)
1947–1948	Burnley	0	(0)
1948–1952	Swindon Town	13	(5)
1952–1954	Headington United	38	(15)
- Cheltenham Town
- * Club domestic league appearances and goals

Robert Charles Peart (17 December 1926 – 22 December 1966) was an English professional footballer who played as a centre forward.
