= Optometry Admission Test =

The Optometry Admission Test (OAT) is a test used to determine applicants' qualification for admission to a school of optometry. All colleges of optometry in the United States and the University of Waterloo in Canada use scores from the exam, in addition to work done at the undergraduate level of study, to decide whether to accept candidates. The test is administered by the American Dental Association (ADA) on behalf of the Association of Schools and Colleges of Optometry (ASCO).

== Administration ==
The OAT is a multiple-choice examination offered year round at Prometric centers. The registration fee is $465 as of July 1, 2019, and there may be additional fees for rescheduling and requesting score reports.

The test consists of four sections:

- Survey of the Natural Sciences
- Reading Comprehension
- Physics
- Quantitative Reasoning

The test lasts, at most, for a total of 4 hours and 50 minutes. This time estimate includes three optional components: a 15-minute pre-test tutorial, a 30-minute mid-test break, and a 15-minute post-testing survey.

=== Test Content ===
The Survey of the Natural Sciences is composed of 100 questions total broken up into three subsections of Biology, General Chemistry, and Organic Chemistry. The Biology subsection consists of 40 questions and the General Chemistry and Organic Chemistry subsections consist of 30 questions.

The Reading Comprehension, Physics, and Quantitative Reasoning each have 40 items. Reading Comprehension will consist of three reading passages and tests one's ability to understand the passage and analyze scientific information. The Quantitative Reasoning section includes both mathematical problems and applied mathematical problems.

Section	Questions	Minutes
Survey of Natural Sciences	100	90
Reading Comprehension	40	50
Physics	40	50
Quantitative Reasoning	40	45

=== Scoring ===
Scoring of the OAT ranges from 200 to 400 with the 50th percentile being set at 300. Test results are not a raw score of correct answers. Rather, the raw score is converted to a scale score between 200 and 400 provided in increments of 10.
