= Classic Learning Test =

Standardized test in the U.S.

CLT
- Type: Computer-based standardized test
- Skills tested: English, math, and critical reasoning skills
- Purpose: Undergraduate admissions (mostly US and Canadian colleges and universities)
- Duration: 2 hours
- Score range: Composite score: 0 to 120
- Languages: English
- Fee: US$69
- Used by: Colleges or universities offering undergraduate programs, or used by teachers and parents for student evaluation
- Website: cltexam.com

The Classic Learning Test (CLT) is a standardized test administered by Classic Learning Initiatives. Designed as an alternative to other standardized tests such as the SAT and ACT and primarily championed by conservatives, the test assesses reading, grammar, writing, and mathematics. The CLT uses classic literature for the majority of reading passages on the exam.

The test can be taken online or in-school and takes approximately two hours to complete. Scores are issued within ten days and are calculated out of 120. The test has faced criticism from researchers, academics, and commentators for being less academically rigorous than the SAT and ACT.

== Background ==
The CLT was created by Jeremy Tate, who was a Maryland college admissions counselor and remedial-English teacher at a public high school in upstate New York. In 2015, Tate created the for-profit Classic Learning Initiatives to market the tests which he promoted as more rigorous than the SAT and the ACT. Tate described the tests as resulting from his dissatisfaction at the American education system and his belief it needed to impart "transmission of this cultural, intellectual, Western inheritance" and that other tests had incorporated "anti-Western left-wing ideology".

== Content ==
As of September 2023, the CLT contained sections on verbal reasoning, quantitative reasoning, and grammar and writing, as well as an optional essay segment.

The test has a noticeable emphasis on Christian thought and many of its textual excerpts come from works by Christian figures such as Augustine of Hippo, Thomas Aquinas, Thomas à Kempis, Teresa of Ávila, Martin Luther, John Calvin, Jonathan Edwards, C. S. Lewis and Pope John Paul II. However, religiously critical individuals such as Mark Twain, Charles Darwin, and Karl Marx also feature in the test's author bank. Other writers excerpted in the test include Jorge Luis Borges, Aristotle, Plato, Cicero, William Shakespeare, Anna Julia Cooper, Toni Morrison, and Ida B. Wells.

The CLT does not allow test-takers to utilize calculators during the quantitative reasoning portion of the exam, while the SAT and ACT do.

== Schools accepting CLT scores ==
Approximately 325 colleges and universities in both the United States and abroad accept the CLT for various purposes related to admissions and course placement. These schools tend to be private, liberal arts or faith-based colleges. Many are evangelical and Catholic schools.

In September 2023, Florida's Board of Governors voted to approve the CLT as an accepted admissions test at all public universities in the state.

Beginning with the 2027 admissions cycle, U.S. service academies will accept CLT scores.

A list of test-optional colleges that do not require any standardized test for admission, but allow the option to send in a CLT score include:

- Benedictine College
- Bob Jones University
- Cedarville University
- Grove City College
- Liberty University
- Harding University
- Mount St. Mary's University
- University of Oklahoma
- Palm Beach Atlantic University
- Saint Vincent College
- St. Olaf College
- Wheaton College (Illinois)
- Zaytuna College

== Criticism and controversies ==
=== Academic rigor ===
Researchers, academics, and commentators have described the test as less rigorous and easier than the SAT and ACT.

A team of independent researchers from Arizona State University, the University of Cincinnati, the University of Alabama, and the University of Illinois Urbana-Champaign given access to internal records regarding the CLT by Classic Learning Initiatives found that "the CLT contains the highest proportion of questions about number sense and pre-algebra, which are typically taught in middle school" and that the verbal-reasoning section was less cognitively complex than the SAT and ACT.

Unlike the SAT and ACT, the CLT has not gone through a standards-setting process to classify student proficiency levels. Instead, the CLT utilizes a "concordance" process to equate CLT scores to those by other tests. Audrey Amrein-Beardsley, the lead researcher studying the CLT described the concordance process as "so methodologically flawed, it’s, like, shocking". Researchers highlighted its sample size was 100 times smaller than the SAT and ACT; they could only access official SAT and CLT scores for half the group with the other half being self reported; and that a quarter of self-reported scores did not match with official scores.

In Florida, the test has been credited by school administrators with a large boost in high school graduation rates, with 70% of seniors who could not pass the state's math exam passing the CLT's math section. Internal data from CLI states that two-thirds of those taking the CLT use it to satisfy Florida high school graduation requirements.
