= General Educational Development =

High school diploma test

Logo of the GED Testing Service, the only authorized provider of the GED test

The General Educational Development (GED) tests are a group of four academic subject tests in the United States and its territories certifying academic knowledge equivalent to a high school diploma. This certification is an alternative to the U.S. high school diploma, as is HiSET. Passing the GED test gives those who do not complete high school, or who do not meet requirements for a high school diploma, the opportunity to earn a Certificate of High School Equivalency or similarly titled credential. GED Testing Service is a joint venture of the American Council on Education, which started the GED program in 1942.

The American Council on Education, in Washington, D.C., which owns the GED trademark, coined the initialism to identify "tests of general equivalency development" that measure proficiency in science, mathematics, social studies, reading, and writing. The GED Testing Service website as of 2023 does not refer to the test as anything but "GED". It is called the GED in most of the United States, and internationally. In 2014, some states in the United States switched from GED to the HiSET and TASC (discontinued December 31, 2021).

The GED Testing Service is a joint venture of the American Council on Education. Pearson is the sole developer for the GED test. The test is taken in person. States and jurisdictions award a high school equivalency credential (also called a high school equivalency development or general equivalency diploma) to persons who meet the passing score requirements.

In addition to English, the GED tests are available in Spanish in several states (e.g. California, Colorado, Illinois, New Jersey, New York, Florida, Nevada, Texas). Tests and test preparation are also offered to people who are incarcerated or who live on military bases. People who live outside the United States and U.S. territories may be eligible to take GED tests through Pearson VUE testing centers. Utah's Adult High School Completion program is an alternative for people who prefer to earn a diploma.

== History ==
GED diploma with instructions, Pennsylvania, 1972

In November 1942, the United States Armed Forces Institute asked the American Council on Education (ACE) to develop a battery of tests to measure high school-level academic skills. These tests gave military personnel and veterans who had enrolled in the military before completing high school a way to demonstrate their proficiency. Passing these tests gave returning soldiers and sailors the academic credentials they needed to get civilian jobs and gain access to post-secondary education or training.

ACE revised the GED tests for a third time in 1988. The most noticeable change to the series was the addition of a writing sample, or essay. The new tests placed more emphasis on socially relevant topics and problem-solving skills. Surveys of test-takers found that more students (65%) reported taking the test with the intention of continuing their education beyond high school, rather than to get better employment (30%).

A fourth revision was made in 2002 to make the test comply with more recent standards for high-school education.

A fifth revision was released on January 2, 2014, designed to be administered on Pearson VUE, a proprietary computer-based testing platform. The new test applies to the United States and internationally, but not to Canada, which used the 2002 version. It retained four content areas—language arts, mathematics, science, and social studies—but with different content to "measure a foundational core of knowledge and skills that are essential for career and college readiness."

Canadian provinces and territories discontinued use of the GED in May 2024, replacing it with the domestically-developed Canadian Adult Education Credential.

== Test administration ==
There are more than 6,000 official GED Testing Centers in the United States and its territories, and several hundred in other countries. Testing centers are most often in adult-education centers, community colleges, and public schools. Students in metropolitan areas may be able to choose from several testing locations.

Official GED Testing Centers are controlled environments. All testing sessions take place either in person or online according to specific rules, and security measures are enforced. Breaks may be permitted between tests, depending on how many tests are being administered in a session. There may be restrictions on what test-takers may bring into the testing room.

There are approximately three to six GED test forms in circulation at any time. This helps catch test-takers who may be cheating. As with any standardized test, the various test forms are calibrated to the same level of difficulty.

The GED has also been administered online since January 2020, but some states (Florida, Hawaii, Iowa, New York, Maine, Massachusetts, West Virginia, Wyoming) do not recognize the GED earned this way.

=== Eligibility ===
Regulations governing who is eligible to take the GED vary by state. According to GED Testing Service policy, students at least 16 years old and not enrolled in high school are eligible for the program. However, many states require the candidate to be 17 years old and a resident of the state. Some states that allow students under 17 years of age to take the test require a letter of parental consent and a letter of consent from the student's school district. In South Africa and Namibia, students who are at least 17 years old are eligible.

=== Cost ===
The cost of the GED test for test-takers varies depending on the state. As of 2014, costs in Maryland were $45, free in New York, but the typical fees are $120 for all four tests, or $30 for each of the four subject tests. There is an additional fee to take the test online, typically $6 per test. The cost of each test outside of the U.S. is $80 each.

In Canada the testing is free in Nova Scotia, New Brunswick, Prince Edward Island, and the Northwest Territories. For the remaining provinces and territories the price varies between $6 per test in Newfoundland and Labrador to $40 per test in Alberta.

=== Students with disabilities ===
People with disabilities who want to take the GED test may be entitled to receive reasonable testing accommodations. If a qualified professional has documented the disability, the candidate should get the appropriate form from the Testing Center:

- Physical disability and chronic-health disability (such as blindness, low vision, hearing impairment, and mobility impairment): "Request for Testing Accommodations—Physical/Chronic Health Disability" form
- Learning or cognitive disability (such as dyslexia, dyscalculia, receptive aphasia, and written-language disorder): "Request for Testing Accommodations—Learning and Other Cognitive Disabilities" form
- Emotional or mental-health disorder (such as bipolar disorder, Tourette's syndrome, and schizophrenia): "Request for Testing Accommodations—Emotional/Mental health" form
- Attention-deficit hyperactivity disorder (inattentive type, hyperactive–impulsive type, or combined type): "Request for Testing Accommodations—Attention-Deficit/Hyperactivity Disorder" form

The candidate returns the completed form to the GED testing center. Each request is considered individually. If accommodations are approved, the local GED testing examiner conducts the testing with the approved accommodations, which are provided at no extra charge. Accommodations may include, but are not limited to:

- Audio cassette tests
- Braille or large-print tests
- Vision-enhancing technologies
- Use of video equipment
- Use of a talking calculator or abacus
- Use of a sign language interpreter
- Use of a scribe (a person who writes down the test-taker's answers)
- Extended testing time

== Passing the GED testing battery ==
Possible scores on each test (4) within the GED battery range from a minimum of 100 to a maximum of 200. A score of 200 on an individual test puts the student in the top 1% of graduating high school seniors. ACE issues recommendations for what constitutes a minimum passing score for any given sub-test (currently 145) and for the test as a whole (currently 580—i.e., an average of 145 per test across all four sub-tests). Although most GED-issuing jurisdictions (for the most part, Boards of Education of U.S. states) adopt these minimum standards as their own, a jurisdiction may choose to establish higher standards for issuance of the certificate. Many jurisdictions award honors-level equivalency diplomas to students who meet certain criteria higher than those for a standard diploma in a given jurisdiction. Some districts hold graduation ceremonies for GED tests passers and/or award scholarships to the highest scorers. The GED test pass rate for all takers is almost 60%.

Colleges that admit based upon high school grades may require a minimum score on the GED test in order to admit students based upon the test. For example, Arizona State University requires an average sub-test score of 500 in addition to the certificate.

If a student passes one or more, but not all four, tests within the battery, he or she only needs to retake the test(s) not passed. Most places limit the number of times students may take each individual test within a year. A student may encounter a waiting period before being allowed to retake a failed test. Tests must be completed by the expiration date, which is generally every two years on the last day of the year.

The GED test is available in many countries around the world. Since 2015, the GED test has become popular in African countries including South Africa and Namibia.

Many government institutions and universities regard the GED test credential as the same as a high school diploma with respect to program eligibility and as a prerequisite for admissions. The U.S. military, however, has higher requirements in admissions for GED test takers to compensate for their lack of a traditional high school diploma.

The test is administered to a representative sample of graduating high-school seniors each year, about 30% of whom fail the test.

== Effects on employability ==
The GED certification itself (i.e., without further post-secondary education or training) does not help people get jobs as much as a high school diploma does. People who have earned the GED credential tend to earn more than dropouts and less than high-school graduates. Economist James Heckman found in a 1993 study that this is primarily due to differences in the characteristics and backgrounds of GED test graduates. When controlling for other influences, he finds no evidence that, for the average taker, the GED test credential improves an individual's economic opportunities above those of other dropouts.

== Calls for abolition ==
There are calls for the GED to be abolished. Those who support abolishing the GED say the program reduces high school graduation rates, is outmoded, and a financial burden for low-income participants.

As of May 3, 2024, the General Education Development (GED) high school equivalency program is no longer available in Canada and is now replaced with the new Canadian Adult Education Credential (CAEC).

== See also ==
- HiSET
- TASC
- CHSPE, a similar California standardized test aimed at high school students
- HSED, a credential issued in Wisconsin that utilizes two additional testing batteries
- Adult high school
