= HiSET =

High school equivalency test

HiSET (High School Equivalency Test) is an alternative to a U.S. high school diploma and the GED test. The test was designed based on the OCTAE College and Career Readiness Standards for Adult Education. It is governed by ETS and is provided in cooperation with relevant authority in 26 states and five territories in the United States.

People who choose to graduate from high school early can earn a high school equivalency (HSE) credential with the HiSET test. Candidates are required to demonstrate that they have the same skills and knowledge as a high school graduate. Upon passing the test, candidates are issued a high school equivalency diploma and test score transcript by the respective state or jurisdiction where they took the test. The HiSET is split into 5 core subject areas: Mathematics, Science, Social Studies, Language Arts – Reading, and Language Arts – Writing. Most HiSET exam questions are multiple choice. In the Language Arts – Writing section, a written essay is required.

== Test scores ==
There are 5 subtests, each with a maximum score of 20 and a pass score of 8. For the essay, the pass score is 2 out of 6. The minimum combined score to pass is 45 out of 100.
