= List of state achievement tests in the United States =

State achievement tests in the United States are standardized tests required in American public schools in order for the schools to receive federal funding, according to the Elementary and Secondary Education Act of 1965, in US Public Law 107-110, and the No Child Left Behind Act of 2001.

== Tests by state ==
The following standardized tests are designed and/or administered by state education agencies and/or local school districts in order to measure academic achievement across multiple grade levels in elementary, middle and senior high school, as well as for high school graduation examinations to measure proficiency for high school graduation.

State	Administrating agency	Tests name	Also called...	Source	Available in languages other than English
Alabama	Alabama State Department of Education	Alabama High School Graduation Exam; Alabama Reading and Mathematics Test	AHSGE; ARMT		No
Alaska	Alaska Department of Education and Early Development	High School Graduation Qualifying Examination; Alaska Measures of Progress (AMP)	HSGQE; SBA		No; However "LEP (Limited English Proficiency) students may be allowed to use a word translation finder style dictionary or word-to-word dictionary from first language to English language. Dictionaries that include pictures or word definitions are not allowed."
Arizona	Arizona Department of Education	Arizona's Instrument to Measure Standards; Arizona's English Language Learner Assessment; National Assessment of Educational Progress	AIMS; AZELLA; NAEP AZMERIT		No
Arkansas	Arkansas Department of Education	Augmented Benchmark Examinations			
California	California Department of Education	CAASPP; California Assessment of Student Performance and Progress	SBAC (previous tests were STAR and CAHSEE)		Yes
Colorado	Colorado Department of Education	Colorado Measures of Academic Success	CMAS		Yes
Connecticut	Connecticut Department of Education	Connecticut Academic Performance Test; Connecticut Mastery Test	CAPT; CMT		
Delaware	Delaware Department of Education	Delaware Comprehensive Assessment System	DCAS		
District of Columbia	District of Columbia Public Schools	Partnership for the Assessment of Readiness for College and Career	PARCC		
Florida	Florida Department of Education	Florida Standards Assessments; Florida Standards Alternate Assessment; Florida Assessment of Standards Test	FSA; FSAA; FAST		No, but Limited English Proficiency (LEP) students are allowed to use a translation dictionary from their first language to the English language approved by the Florida Department of Education. The dictionary may include synonyms and an index, but must not include definition of words. Test administrators or proctors are also not allowed to read aloud to the student any of the questions, passages, prompts, or answer choices in the English language or their first language during the test.
Georgia	Georgia Department of Education	Criterion-Referenced Competency Tests (retired) Georgia Milestones: End of Course Test(grades 9-12); End of Grade Test(grades 3-8); Georgia High School Graduation Test (retired); Georgia Alternate Assessment; Georgia Writings Assessments (retired)	CRCT; EOCT; GHSGT; GAA; GMAS		
Hawaii	Hawaii Department of Education	Hawaii State Assessment; Hawaii State Alternative Assessment	HSA/HSAA		
Idaho	Idaho State Department of Education	Idaho Standards Achievement Test	I-SAT		
Illinois	Illinois State Board of Education	Illinois Standards Achievement Test; Prairie State Achievement Examination	ISAT; PSAE		
Indiana	Indiana Department of Education	Indiana Statewide Testing for Educational Progress-Plus	I-STEP+ New Test as of 2019 - ILearn		
Iowa	Iowa Department of Education	Iowa Test of Basic Skills; Iowa Tests of Educational Development	ITBS; ITED		
Kansas	Kansas Department of Education	Kansas Mathematics Assessment; Kansas Reading Assessment; Kansas Writing Assessment; Kansas Science Assessment; Kansas History, Government, Economics and Geography Assessment			
Kentucky	Kentucky Department of Education	Commonwealth Accountability Testing System	CATS		
Louisiana	Louisiana Department of Education	Louisiana Educational Assessment Program; Integrated LEAP; Graduate Exit Examination	LEAP iLEAP; GEE		
Maine	Maine Department of Education	Maine Educational Assessment; Maine High School Assessment	MEA; MHSA		
Maryland	Maryland Department of Education	Maryland School Assessment; High School Assessment	MSA; HSA		
Massachusetts	Massachusetts Department of Education	Massachusetts Comprehensive Assessment System	MCAS		
Michigan	Michigan Department of Education	Michigan Educational Assessment Program (retired); Michigan Merit Exam; Michigan Student Test of Educational Progress	MEAP; MME; M-STEP		
Minnesota	Minnesota Department of Education	Minnesota Comprehensive Assessments—Series II	MCA-II		
Mississippi	Mississippi Department of Education	Mississippi Functional Literacy Exam; Mississippi Curriculum Test	MFLE; MCT		
Missouri	Missouri Department of Elementary and Secondary Education	Missouri Assessment Program	MAP		
Montana	Montana Office of Public Instruction	Montana Comprehensive Assessment System	MontCAS		
Nebraska	Nebraska Department of Education				
Nevada	Nevada Department of Education	Nevada Proficiency Examination Program	NPEP		
New Hampshire	New Hampshire Department of Education	New England Common Assessment Program	NECAP		
New Jersey	New Jersey Department of Education	The Partnership for Assessment of Readiness for College and Careers	NJSLA; NJGPA		
New Mexico	New Mexico Public Education Department	New Mexico Standards-based assessment New Mexico Alternate Performance Assessment	NMSBA; NMAPA		
New York	New York State Department of Education	Regents Examinations New York State Examination	Regents; NYSE		Yes, translation is available for all Regents exams except for language exams. For English exams, a glossary is available, while foreign language exams have none.
North Carolina	North Carolina Department of Public Instruction	North Carolina End of Grade Tests (Grades 3-8); End of Course Tests (Grades 9-12)	EOGs; EOCs		
North Dakota	North Dakota Department of Public Instruction	North Dakota State Assessment	North Dakota CAT		
Ohio	Ohio State Board of Education	Ohio’s State Tests	OST (Many districts incorrectly refer to as the "AIR Test")		
Oklahoma	Oklahoma State Department of Education	Oklahoma Core Curriculum Tests	OCCT		
Oregon	Oregon Department of Education	Oregon Assessment of Knowledge and Skills	OAKS		
Pennsylvania	Pennsylvania Department of Education	Pennsylvania System of School Assessment; Pennsylvania Alternate School Assessment; Keystone Exam	PSSA; PASA		
Rhode Island	Rhode Island Department of Elementary and Secondary Education	Rhode Island Comprehensive Assessment System	RICAS		RIDE publishes a list of bilingual dictionaries and glossaries that current and former English Learner students may use on RICAS assessments. There are Spanish versions of the Mathematics tests.
South Carolina	South Carolina Department of Education	Palmetto Assessment of State Standards (Grades 3-8); High School Assessment Program (Grades 9-12)	PASS; HSAP		
South Dakota	South Dakota Department of Education	South Dakota State Test of Educational Progress	DSTEP		
Tennessee	Tennessee State Department of Education	Tennessee Comprehensive Assessment Program	TN Ready		
Texas	Texas Education Agency	State of Texas Assessments of Academic Readiness (retiring 2027) Student Success Tool (Starting 2027)	STAAR SST		
Utah	Utah State Office of Education	Student Assessment of Growth and Excellence	SAGE		
Vermont	Vermont Department of Education	Smarter Balanced Assessment Consortium	SBAC		
Virginia	Virginia Department of Education	Standards of Learning	SOL		
Washington	Washington State Office of Superintendent of Public Instruction	Washington Assessment of Student Learning	WASL		
West Virginia	West Virginia Department of Education	West Virginia General Summative Assessment	WVGSA (Previously WESTEST)		
Wisconsin	Wisconsin Department of Public Instruction	Wisconsin Knowledge and Concepts Examination	WKCE		
Wyoming	Wyoming Department of Education	Proficiency Assessments for Wyoming Students	PAWS		

== Additional tests ==
In addition to the following list some states administer other required examinations. They include Nevada, which administers several tests as part of the Nevada Proficiency Examination Program. They include the High School Proficiency Examination for Reading and Mathematics; the Iowa Test of Basic Skills; Iowa Tests of Educational Development; Criterion-referenced tests in Reading, Mathematics, and Science; Language Proficiency Assessment; Nevada Alternate Scales of Academic Achievement; and National Assessment of Educational Progress. The Prairie State Achievement Exam is used in Illinois, along with the Illinois State Achievement Test. Alabama requires the Stanford Achievement Test Series; and in Texas, the Texas Higher Education Assessment. That state has discontinued its usage of the Texas Assessment of Academic Skills. From the 2007–08 school year, Kentucky required that all students at public high schools take the ACT in their junior year. Beginning in 2026, students will take the SAT. Some school districts in Florida also require the ACT.

== See also ==
- Adequate Yearly Progress
- Standardized test
- List of admissions tests
- Standards-based assessment
