= List of exit examinations in the United States =

State graduation or exit examinations in the United States are standardized tests in American public schools in order for students to receive a high school diploma, according to that state's secondary education curriculum. Massachusetts in 2024 repealed the legal requirement for students to pass the MCAS to graduate high school.

State	Administrating agency	Test name	Also called...	Source
Alabama	Alabama State Department of Education	Alabama High School Graduation Exam	AHSGE	
Alaska	Alaska Department of Education and Early Development	High School Graduation Qualifying Examination	HSGQE; SBA	
Arizona	Arizona Department of Education	Arizona's Instrument to Measure Standards	AIMS	
Arkansas	Arkansas Department of Education	Augmented Benchmark Examination		
California	California Department of Education	California High School Exit Exam	CAHSEE	
Florida	Florida Department of Education	Florida Assessment of Student Thinking	FAST	
Indiana	Indiana Department of Education	Indiana Statewide Testing for Educational Progress-Plus	I-STEP+	
Louisiana	Louisiana Department of Education	Graduate Exit Examination	GEE	
Maryland	Maryland Department of Education	High School Assessment Maryland Comprehensive Assessment Program	HSA MCAP	
Minnesota	Minnesota Department of Education	Minnesota Comprehensive Assessments—Series II	MCA-II	
Missouri	Missouri Department of Elementary and Secondary Education	Missouri Assessment Program	MAP	
Nevada	Nevada Department of Education	Nevada Proficiency Examination Program	NPEP	
New Jersey	New Jersey Department of Education	High School Proficiency Assessment	HSPA	
New Mexico	New Mexico Public Education Department	New Mexico Standards-based assessment	NMSBA	
New York	New York State Department of Education	Regents Examinations	Regents	
North Carolina	North Carolina Department of Public Instruction	End of Course Tests (Grades 9-12)	EOCs	
Ohio	Ohio State Board of Education	Ohio Graduation Test	OGT	
Pennsylvania	Pennsylvania Department of Education	Keystone Exam		
South Carolina	South Carolina Department of Education	High School Assessment Program (Grades 9-12)	HSAP	
Tennessee	Tennessee Department of Education	Tennessee Comprehensive Assessment Program	TCAP	
Texas	Texas Education Agency	State of Texas Assessment of Academic Readiness	STAAR	
Virginia	Virginia Department of Education	Standards of Learning	SOL	
