= Education in Georgia (U.S. state) =

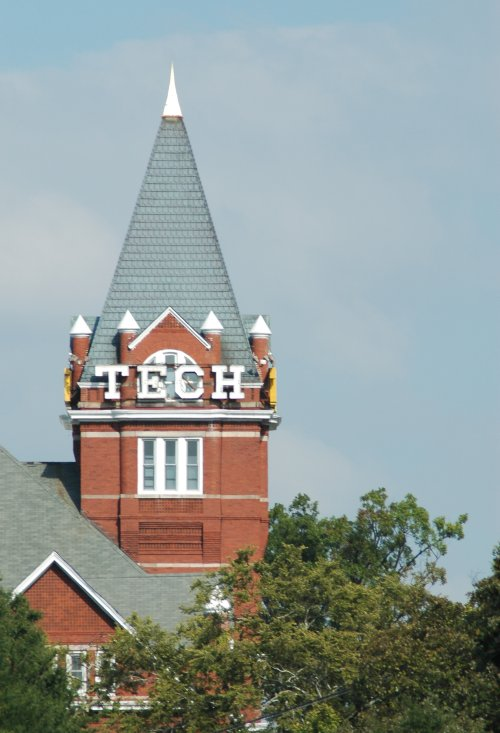
Georgia Tech's Tech Tower

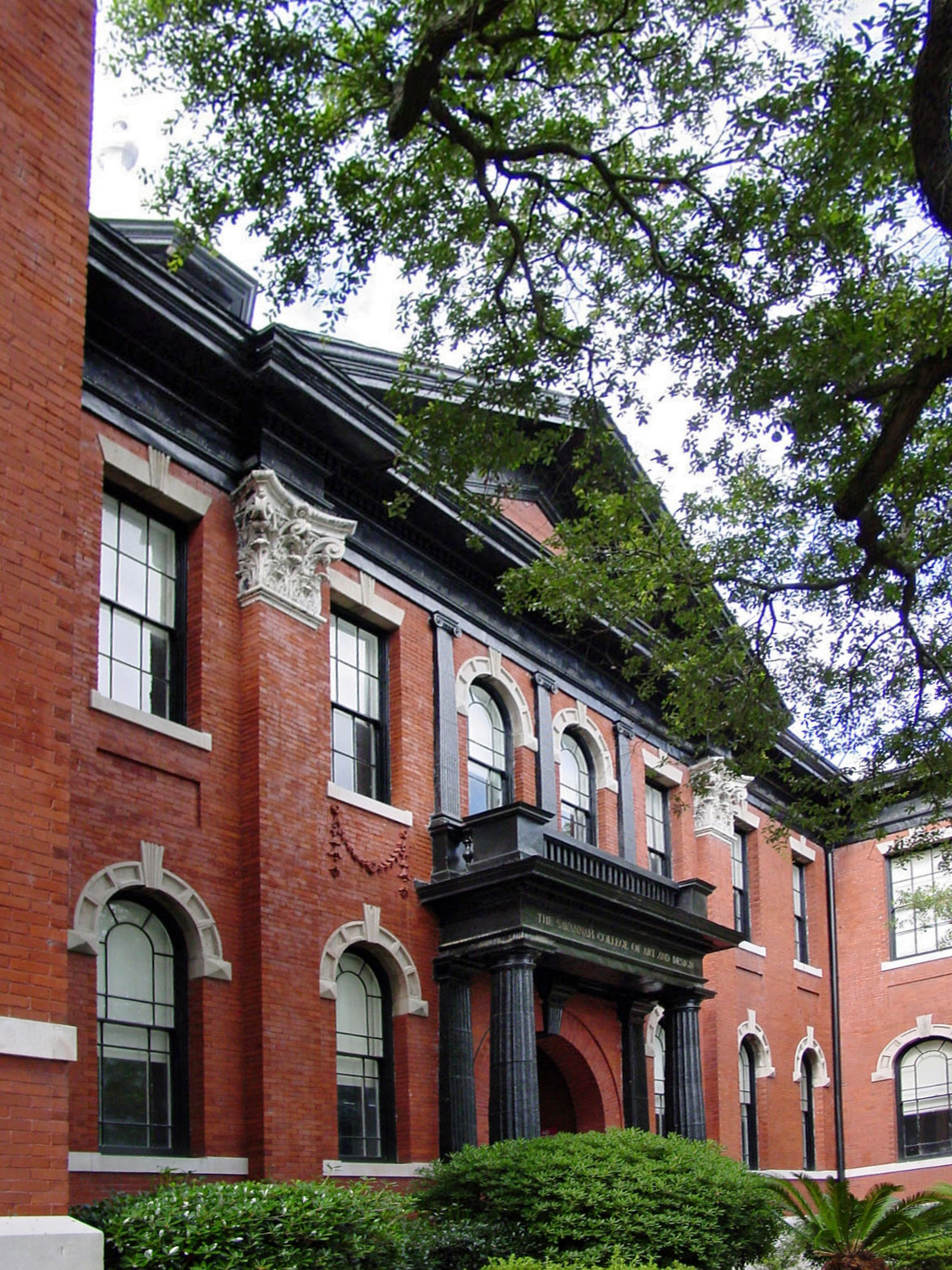
Anderson Hall at Savannah College of Art and Design

Education consists of public and private schools in the U.S. state of Georgia, including the University System of Georgia, Technical College System of Georgia, private colleges, and secondary and primary schools.

== Governance structure ==
The vast majority of public schools in the state are operated by county-ordered districts, with city-based districts (autonomous from county districts) being a small minority (namely Pelham, Atlanta, Decatur, Social Circle, Marietta, Commerce, Dalton, Dublin, Gainesville, Jefferson, Rome, Thomasville, Trion, Valdosta, Vidalia, Bremen, Buford, Calhoun, and Cartersville).

=== State Board of Education ===
The Georgia Department of Education (GaDOE) administers public education in the state. The department is administered by an elected State Superintendent of Schools. Local municipalities and their respective school districts operate individual public schools but the GaDOE audits performance of public schools. The GaDOE also makes recommendations to state leaders concerning education spending and policies.

=== Nonpublic Postsecondary Education Commission ===
The Georgia Nonpublic Postsecondary Education Commission (GNPEC) has statutory responsibilities in matters relating to nonpublic, postsecondary, educational institutions as per O.C.G.A. § 20-3-250 “Nonpublic Postsecondary Educational Institutions Act of 1990.”

The Hechinger Report found in 2020 that since 2014, thirty schools had announced their closing with an email or a notice at the school's entrance. The U.S. Department of Education receives school financial information, but the data may be outdated upon receipt. Accrediting agencies may have more timely data, but are inconsistent in their response. Some state monitoring agencies don't have the ability to closely check financial status. According to the Hechinger Report, the GNPEC does more than many other states. The finances of most institutions are checked by an external auditor prior to reauthorization each year. When Argosy University abruptly closed in March 2019, the GNPEC had funding available to provide tuition refunds. However, Georgia law limits the claims to $250,000 for a defaulting institution. Federal law requires schools in financial trouble to prepare transition plans for existing students. These Teach-out plans are meant to provide students with alternative schools offering equivalent programs. The GNPEC retains student transcript records for shuttered schools, but cannot access detail records that document student work and are necessary when the student transfers.

The mission of the GNPEC "is to ensure that each authorized nonpublic postsecondary educational institution in Georgia is satisfying its commitments to hardworking Georgians through sound academics and financial stability". All in-state nonpublic and out-of-state postsecondary education institutions that want to operate in the State of Georgia must receive authorization from the GNPEC and renew that authorization in subsequent years. Any business in Georgia that wants to include "university" or "college" in its name is required to obtain permission from GNPEC. Even entities that have no physical presence in Georgia are required to be authorized if they offer their programs to Georgia residents. New York and Washington do not.

== Performance and rankings ==
Georgia ranked 30th in the nation for educational performance, according to Education Week's Quality Counts 2018 report. The state had earned an overall score of 73.0 out of 100 points. On average, the nation received a score of 75.2; meaning the state ranked slightly below average. Georgia posted a C-plus in the Chance-for-Success category, ranking 33rd on factors that contribute to a person's success both within and outside the K-12 education system. Georgia received a mark of D-plus and finished 37th for School Finance. It ranked 11th with a grade of C on the K-12 Achievement Index.

== Secondary schools ==
In 2016, Georgia had a high school graduation rate of 80.6%, putting it 41st in the country. Georgia high schools (grades nine through twelve) are required to administer a standardized, multiple choice End of Course Test, or EOC, in each of eight core subjects including Algebra I, Geometry, U.S. History, Economics, Biology, Physical Science, Ninth Grade Literature and Composition, and American Literature and Composition. The official purpose of the tests is to assess "specific content knowledge and skills." Although a minimum test score is not required for the student to receive credit in the course, completion of the test is mandatory. The EOC score comprises 20% of a student's grade in the course. Until 2014, the Criterion-Referenced Competency Tests (CRCT) was taken in 1st-8th grade. The CRCT was replaced by the Georgia Milestones end-of-grade exams for the 2014–15 school year.

Through the 2013–14 school year, high school students were also required receive passing scores on four Georgia High School Graduation Tests (GHSGT) and the Georgia High School Writing Assessment in order to receive a diploma. Subjects assessed included Mathematics, Science, Language Arts, and Social Studies. These tests are initially offered during students' eleventh-grade year, allowing for multiple opportunities to pass the tests before graduation at the end of twelfth grade. These exams were replaced with the redesigned end-of-course exams as part of the Georgia Milestones program.

== Higher education ==
Georgia has 62 public colleges, universities, and technical colleges in addition to over 45 private institutes of higher learning.

The HOPE Scholarship, funded by the state lottery, was available to all Georgia residents who have graduated from high school with a 3.0 or higher grade point average and who attend a public college or university in the state. The scholarship covers the cost of tuition and provides a stipend for books for up to 120 credit hours. If the student does not maintain a 3.0 average while in college they may lose the scholarship in which case they will have the chance to get it back by bringing their grade point average above a 3.0 within a period of 30 credit hours. This scholarship has had a significant impact on the state university system, increasing competition for admission and increasing the quality of education.

In 2011, facing a budget shortfall, the state cut portions of the HOPE scholarship. Bill 326 trimmed scholarships by 90 percent. High school seniors who earn a 3.7 GPA and a 1200 on the SAT will still be able to get a full scholarship, now known as the Zell Miller scholarship, under the new law. Students who previously qualified for HOPE can still receive a scholarship worth 80% of tuition. Current college students are not eligible for the full scholarship amount.

=== Private Institutions ===
- Agnes Scott College
- American Intercontinental University
- Andersonville Theological Seminary
- Andrew College
- Argosy University
- Art Institute of Atlanta
- Atlanta College of Art
- Bauder College
- Berry College
- Brenau University
- Clark Atlanta University
- Columbia Theological Seminary
- Covenant College
- Emmanuel College
- Emory University
- Interdenominational Theological Center
- LaGrange College
- Life University
- Mercer University
- Morehouse College
- Morehouse School of Medicine
- Morris Brown College
- Oglethorpe University
- Oxford College of Emory University
- Paine College
- Piedmont University
- Point University
- Reinhardt University
- Savannah College of Art and Design
- Shorter University
- South University
- Spelman College
- Thomas University
- Toccoa Falls College
- Truett McConnell University
- Wesleyan College
- Westwood College
- Young Harris College

== See also ==
- Georgia Educational Technology Fair
