= OCCT =

OCCT may refer to:

- Oceanic-Creations Composite Technology, a process for producing a carbon fibre based construction material
- OCC Transport, a transportation service serving Binghamton University
- Oklahoma Core Curriculum Tests, a standardized test
- Open CASCADE Technology, a software library
