= Ohio Graduation Test =

High school examination in Ohio, USA

The Ohio Graduation Test (OGT) is the high school graduation examination given to sophomores in the U.S. state of Ohio. Students must pass all five sections (reading, writing, mathematics, science and social studies) in order to graduate. Students have multiple chances to pass these sections and can still graduate without passing each using the alternative pathway. In 2009, the Ohio legislature passed an education reform bill eliminating the OGT in favor of a new assessment system. The development and transition of replacement began in 2014 and ended in 2022.

== Test History and Development ==
=== History ===
Prior to the OGT, passing the ninth grade proficiency test was required for graduation beginning with the class of 1994. It had the same five subjects, apart from the social studies test was referred to as the citizenship test.

In 2001, the Ohio legislature directed the Ohio Department of Education (ODE) to develop the OGT based on the soon-to-be-adopted academic content standards. The first official OGT was given in March 2005. It replaced the ninth grade proficiency test as a graduation requirement for the class of 2007. The last administration of the ninth grade proficiency test was in 2005.

=== Development ===
Questions are developed by ODE staff, sent through committees, and placed on exams before official inclusion on the OGT. First, the Content Advisory Committee runs the ODE developed question past parents and educators to see if it addresses the content. Second, the Fairness Sensitivity Review Committee helps ensure that questions are fair and do not put any student at a disadvantage because of a student’s moral values, social status, or religious beliefs. Third, the question is field tested. It is placed on an exam, but does not count towards the score of the student. Finally, the committees evaluate the performance data and decide if the question is to be used.

== Test Characteristics ==
=== Questions ===
The OGT is made up of five tests: reading, writing, mathematics, science, and social studies. These sections match the core school subjects and fulfill the high school testing requirement in reading, mathematics, and science under the federal No Child Left Behind Act. Each of the five sections is formatted differently, but they each contain multiple choice, short answer, and extended response questions:

Subject	Multiple Choice	Short Answer	Extended Response
Reading	32	4	2
Writing	10	1	2
Mathematics	32	5	1
Science	32	4	2
Social Studies	32	4	2

total 38 questions

Each exam has approximately six extra questions that are being field tested for future OGT tests. Students are not penalized for incorrect answers on field tested questions. Students have up to two and a half hours to complete each section of the test. Typically, the tests are split up so that there is only one per day (for five days).

=== Testing Dates ===
The OGT is first given to students in the spring of their sophomore year. If they do not pass all five sections, they can continue to retake the exam. The OGT is administered in the fall (October), spring (March), and summer (June) each year. Not all schools offer the summer OGT, but students can be directed to one that does. Summer testing also requires a student to take at least 10 hours of preparatory programs beforehand. A typical student will have seven opportunities to pass the OGT before he or she is scheduled to graduate.

=== Accommodations ===
There are special accommodations of the OGT for students with special needs. These accommodations include tests with readers, in large print, and different languages like Spanish, Chinese, and Somali. Students with an Individualized Education Program (IEP) may be exempted from the requirement to pass all sections of the OGT or may take another assessment if the plan allows. For students with significant disabilities, there is an alternate assessment that requires a collection of evidence that demonstrates knowledge appropriate for the student’s disabilities.

== Alternative Pathway ==
Passing all five of the OGT tests is required to earn an Ohio diploma for both public and private school students (excluding IEP issues). However, there is an exception for students who come very close. The alternative pathway lets student who meet seven specific requirements to graduate without passing all five tests. High school guidance counselors determine if students qualify for this option. A student qualifies for the alternative pathway if they:

1. Pass all the tests but one, and earn at least a 390 on the failed test;
2. Have a 97% attendance rate, not including excused absences, for each of the last four years;
3. Have not been expelled in the past four years;
4. Have a GPA of 2.5 out of 4.0 in the subject area of the failed test;
5. Complete the high school curriculum requirements;
6. Have taken “intervention programs” to help their performance on the tests and have a 97% attendance rate, not including excused absence, in those programs; and
7. Receive a letter recommending graduation from each of the student’s high school teachers in the subject area of the failed OGT and the student's high school principal.

== Assessment Reforms ==
=== Ohio Reforms ===
In 2009, the Ohio legislature passed an education reform bill that, among other things, called for the OGT to be replaced. To receive a diploma, students will have to earn a certain composite score drawn from a new three part assessment system:

- A national standardized assessment (such as the ACT) that assesses science, mathematics, and English language arts
- A series of end-of-course exams in English language arts, mathematics, science, and social studies
- A senior project by a student or a group of students

The academic content standards and the model curriculum must be finished before the new assessment system can be developed to assure alignment. Work will begin on developing this new system in 2011. There is no set date for the beginning of the new assessment system, but the 2013-2014 school year has been targeted. The OGT will be phased out until 2022.

=== National Assessments ===
Also in 2009, the federal Race to the Top $4.35 billion incentive program was announced. It included up to $350 million for common assessment development. Various consortia of states formed to compete for this grant. Ohio signed memorandums of understanding with two groups: Smarter Balance and Achieve. Whatever assessment systems these groups design may supersede the modified Ohio Achievement Assessment (grades 3-8), the three part assessment system, and the composite score passed by the Ohio legislature.

== Criticisms ==
The OGT receives many of the same criticisms as other states’ standardized tests. Chief among them is that the assessments drive instruction, give students increased testing anxiety, and test preparations distract from classroom learning. The activist, perennial candidate, and former 98 Degrees singer Justin Jeffre filed a formal letter of complaint asserting the OGT is "unfair" according to guidelines set forth in the Ohio Administrative Code.

== See also ==
- List of state achievement tests in the United States
- Standards-based education
