= American Book Company =

American Book Company may refer to:

- American Book Company (1890), established in New York City in 1890
- American Book Company (1996), established in Woodstock, Georgia, in 1996
