= EOCT =

EOCT may refer to:

- End of Course Test
- Eastern Oklahoma County Turnpike
