= New Carlisle, Indiana =

- Town
- New Carlisle from the air, looking East

- Logo

- Location of New Carlisle in St. Joseph County, Indiana.
- Coordinates: 41°42′02″N 86°29′47″W
- Country: United States
- State: Indiana
- County: St. Joseph
- Township: Olive

Area
  - Total: 2.23 sq mi (5.78 km^{2})
  - Land: 2.23 sq mi (5.78 km^{2})
  - Water: 0 sq mi (0.00 km^{2})
- Elevation: 748 ft (228 m)

Population (2020)
  - Total: 1,891
  - Density: 935.1/sq mi (361.04/km^{2})
- Time zone: UTC-5 (Eastern (EST))
  - Summer (DST): UTC-4 (EDT)
- ZIP code: 46552
- Area code: 574
- FIPS code: 18-52704
- GNIS feature ID: 2396800
- Website: townofnewcarlisle.in.gov

New Carlisle is a town in Olive Township, St. Joseph County, in the U.S. state of Indiana. The population was 1,891, as of the 2020 Census. It is part of the South Bend–Mishawaka, IN-MI, Metropolitan Statistical Area.

== History ==
New Carlisle was originally known as Bourissa Hills. This was named after Lazarus Bourissa, a Potawatamie graduate of the Carey Mission who had been granted this section of land by the treaty that moved most of the Potawatamie to the west. It was platted under the name of New Carlisle, by Richard Risley Carlisle, who had come from Philadelphia, in 1835. The New Carlisle post office has been in operation since 1837.

The New Carlisle Historic District and Jeremiah Service House are listed on the National Register of Historic Places.

The Indiana Enterprise Center, a mega-sized industrial park located in New Carlisle, was the subject of a popular 2020 documentary film called "Prime Farmland". IMDB.

New Carlisle is home to the Honeysuckle solar generating station. The 188 MWdc thousand-acre solar project entered service in 2024. It is also home to an Amazon data center, which, as of 2025, is the company's largest. In December 2025, after ten hours of testimony, the St. Joseph County Council voted against an additional $13 billion data center to be built near New Carlisle. In a previous meeting of the St. Joseph County Area Planning Commission, residents had voiced concerns about water and electricity use of the proposed data center as well as safety concerns due to construction traffic.

== Geography ==
According to the 2020 census, New Carlisle has a total area of 2.23 square miles (5.78 km^{2}), all land.

== Demographics ==
Historical population
Census	Pop.	Note	%±
1880	530		—
1890	607		14.5%
1900	597		−1.6%
1910	612		2.5%
1920	609		−0.5%
1930	718		17.9%
1940	747		4.0%
1950	983		31.6%
1960	1,376		40.0%
1970	1,434		4.2%
1980	1,439		0.3%
1990	1,446		0.5%
2000	1,505		4.1%
2010	1,861		23.7%
2020	1,891		1.6%
U.S. Decennial Census

=== 2020 census ===
As of the 2020 census, New Carlisle had a population of 1,891. The median age was 37.8 years. 26.0% of residents were under the age of 18 and 16.2% of residents were 65 years of age or older. For every 100 females there were 93.4 males, and for every 100 females age 18 and over there were 88.7 males age 18 and over.

0.0% of residents lived in urban areas, while 100.0% lived in rural areas.

There were 752 households in New Carlisle, of which 35.2% had children under the age of 18 living in them. Of all households, 46.3% were married-couple households, 19.9% were households with a male householder and no spouse or partner present, and 25.8% were households with a female householder and no spouse or partner present. About 27.2% of all households were made up of individuals and 10.7% had someone living alone who was 65 years of age or older.

There were 839 housing units, of which 10.4% were vacant. The homeowner vacancy rate was 0.9% and the rental vacancy rate was 15.1%.

Racial composition as of the 2020 census
Race	Number	Percent
White	1,714	90.6%
Black or African American	34	1.8%
American Indian and Alaska Native	6	0.3%
Asian	5	0.3%
Native Hawaiian and Other Pacific Islander	0	0.0%
Some other race	9	0.5%
Two or more races	123	6.5%
Hispanic or Latino (of any race)	50	2.6%

=== 2010 census ===
As of the census of 2010, there were 1,861 people, 719 households, and 520 families living in the town. The population density was 890.4 inhabitants per square mile (343.8/km^{2}). There were 795 housing units at an average density of 380.4 per square mile (146.9/km^{2}). The racial makeup of the town was 96.0% White, 0.8% African American, 0.6% Native American, 0.4% Asian, 0.2% from other races, and 2.0% from two or more races. Hispanic or Latino of any race were 1.3% of the population.

There were 719 households, of which 39.4% had children under the age of 18 living with them, 50.3% were married couples living together, 15.0% had a female householder with no husband present, 7.0% had a male householder with no wife present, and 27.7% were non-families. 23.6% of all households were made up of individuals, and 9.1% had someone living alone who was 65 years of age or older. The average household size was 2.59 and the average family size was 3.04.

The median age in the town was 36.1 years. 28.2% of residents were under the age of 18; 8% were between the ages of 18 and 24; 25.2% were from 25 to 44; 26.8% were from 45 to 64; and 11.9% were 65 years of age or older. The gender makeup of the town was 47.9% male and 52.1% female.

=== 2000 census ===
As of the census of 2000, there were 1,505 people, 608 households, and 403 families living in the town. The population density was 820.3 inhabitants per square mile (316.7/km^{2}). There were 633 housing units at an average density of 345.0 per square mile (133.2/km^{2}). The racial makeup of the town was 98.01% White, 0.47% African American, 0.33% Native American, 0.07% Asian, 0.33% from other races, and 0.80% from two or more races. Hispanic or Latino of any race were 1.13% of the population.

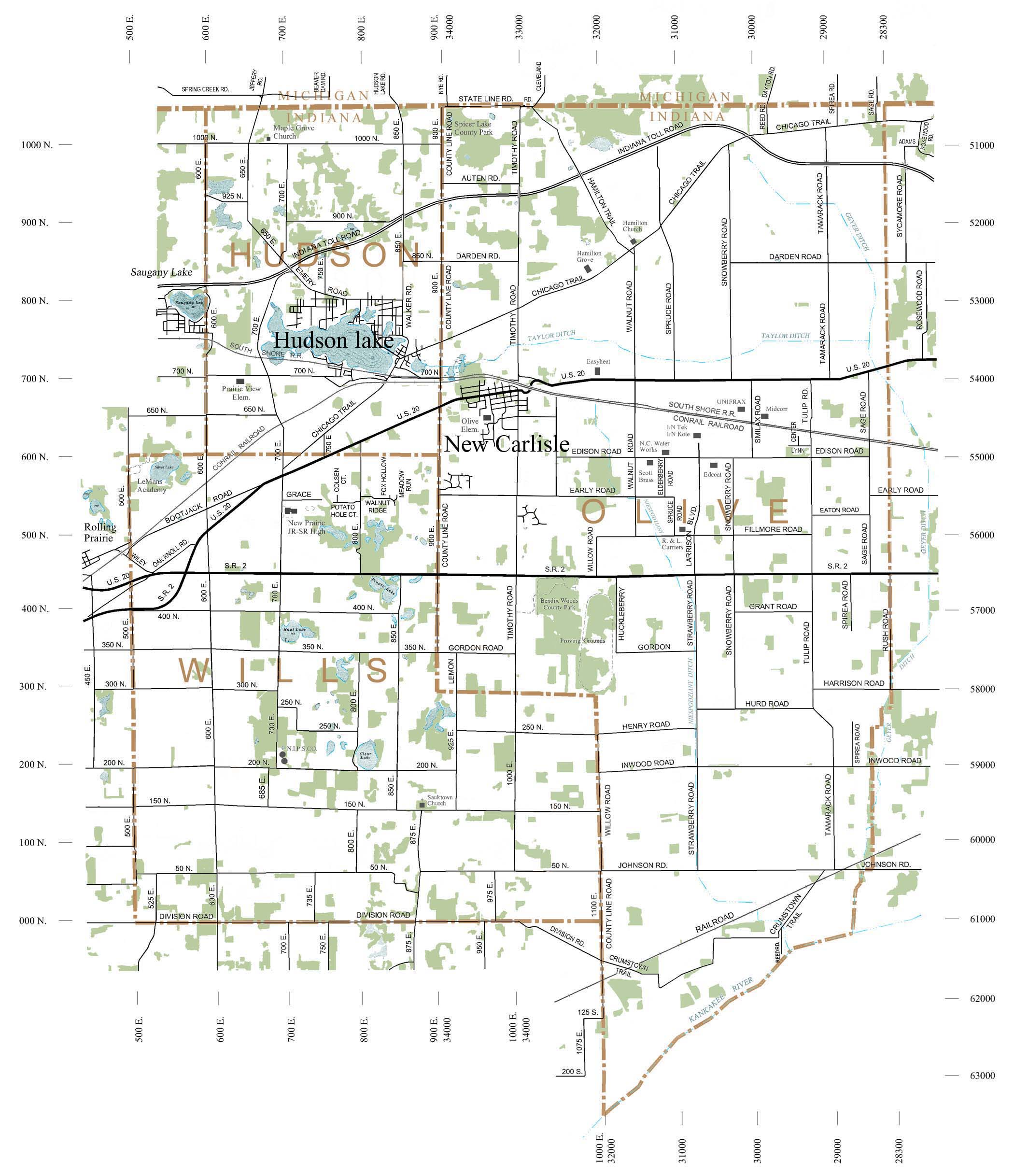
New Carlisle area map

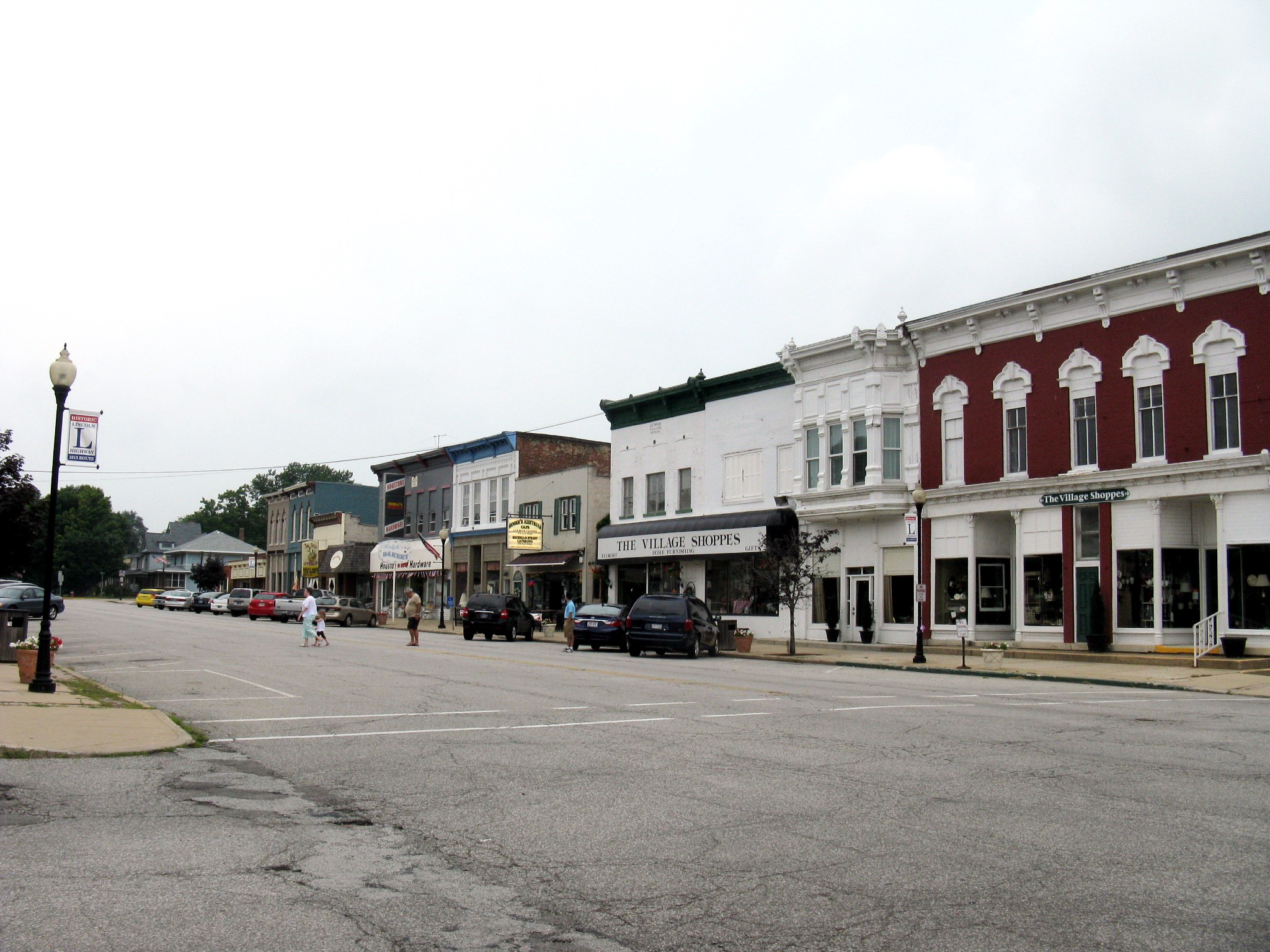
The historic district of New Carlisle is listed on the National Register of Historic Places

There were 609 households, out of which 34.7% had children under the age of 18 living with them, 51.8% were married couples living together, 10.5% had a female householder with no husband present, and 33.6% were non-families. 28.3% of all households were made up of individuals, and 12.0% had someone living alone who was 65 years of age or older. The average household size was 2.48 and the average family size was 3.07.

In the town, the population was spread out, with 28.0% under the age of 18, 7.0% from 18 to 24, 29.0% from 25 to 44, 21.5% from 45 to 64, and 14.5% who were 65 years of age or older. The median age was 36 years. For every 100 females, there were 86.5 males. For every 100 females age 18 and over, there were 84.4 males.

The median income for a household in the town was $36,542, and the median income for a family was $45,147. Males had a median income of $37,500 versus $22,250 for females. The per capita income for the town was $18,597. About 4.1% of families and 6.6% of the population were below the poverty line, including 8.0% of those under age 18 and 6.4% of those age 65 or over.

== Education ==
New Carlisle is home to three of five schools in the New Prairie United School Corporation. New Prairie High School has an enrollment of approximately 875 students and is one of 27 high schools that received exemplary status according to the scores of the 2006 ISTEP tests. It is the only school in LaPorte, Elkhart, and Marshall counties to receive this honor. The other schools in New Carlisle that are part of the NPUSC are New Prairie Middle School, and Olive Township Elementary School.

The town has a lending library, the New Carlisle-Olive Township Public Library.

== Transportation ==
The South Shore Line had a New Carlisle stop until 1994, when a number of stations with low ridership were eliminated from its schedule. Today, the closest South Shore Line station is located in the next door Hudson Lake, an unincorporated town in LaPorte County. The closest Amtrak station is located in South Bend, Indiana. While the South Bend public transit system served the town in the past, this has not been the case in decades.

There has been exploration taken into possibly building a new station in New Carlisle.

== Religion ==
There are several churches in New Carlisle. The New Carlisle United Methodist Church is located at 300 E Compton Street in New Carlisle. They have a food pantry and do many outreach activities throughout the year. The Monastery of the Nativity of the Mother of God is located just south of New Carlisle at 32787 Early Road. The monastery, in the care of Mother Macrina, is under the jurisdiction of the Serbian Orthodox Church in North and South America.

== Media ==
Prancer (1989) had scenes filmed in New Carlisle.

== Notable people ==
- Merrill Brockway: Emmy Award-winning producer and director at PBS
- Schuyler Colfax: was a Representative from Indiana and the 17th Vice President of the United States
- Bill Doba: former head football coach at Washington State University
