= West Virginia Educational Standards Test =

The West Virginia Educational Standards Test (WESTEST) is a criterion-referenced test measured student's knowledge of the West Virginia Content Standards. It is designed to meet NCLB requirements. Tests are administered in Science, Social Studies, Mathematics, and Reading/Language Arts in grades 3-11.

The WESTEST reports out Lexile measures for students in grades 3-11. A Lexile measure can be used to match readers with targeted text and monitor growth in reading ability. There are five levels in which a student can get, Novice, Partial Mastery, Mastery, Above Mastery, and Distinguished.
