= American Book Company (1996) =

American textbook and software publishing company

- Company type: Private
- Industry: Educational publishing
- Founded: 1996 by Dr. Frank Pintozzi and Colleen Pintozzi
- Founders: Dr. Frank Pintozzi and Colleen Pintozzi
- Headquarters: Woodstock, Georgia, United States
- Area served: United States
- Products: Textbooks; Educational software
- Services: Online practice testing
- Number of employees: 25-50 (2009)
- Website: www.americanbookcompany.com

American Book Company is a textbook and software publishing company. Its main focus is on standardized test preparation materials. It offers books covering language arts, mathematics, science, and social studies tests. The company also produces transparencies, basic review books, and ACT and SAT preparation books.

It currently publishes nearly 200 materials, most of them specifically developed for Alabama, Arizona, California, Florida, Georgia, Indiana, Louisiana, Maine, Maryland, Minnesota, Mississippi, Nevada, New Jersey, North Carolina, Ohio, South Carolina, Tennessee, and Texas.

== Company history ==
American Book Company was founded in 1996 by Dr. Frank Pintozzi, a professor of reading and English as a Second Language at Kennesaw State University, and Colleen Pintozzi, a math teacher and supervisor of General Educational Development programs.

They began writing textbooks for nearby South Carolina. After finding success, they created more books for states across the country.

== Book Features ==
Mastering the GA CRCT 7th in Language Arts by American Book Company

American Book Company books have frequent references to standards provided by state departments of education. Each book is based around multiple practice tests modeled after the relevant state test.

Many of the company's books include links to online modules curated by the National Science Teachers Association's sciLINKS program.

== Books Adopted by State Boards of Education ==
Screen from Protein Synthesis Animation

As of 2009, the following fourteen American Book Company books have been officially adopted by the Alabama and Georgia departments of education:

- Mastering the AL Direct Assessment in Writing: Grade 10 ISBN 1-932410-68-6
- Mastering the GA CRCT 6th in Language Arts ISBN 978-1-59807-167-2
- Mastering the GA CRCT 6th in Reading ISBN 978-1-59807-066-8
- Mastering the GA CRCT 7th in Language Arts ISBN 978-1-59807-168-9
- Mastering the GA CRCT 7th in Reading ISBN 978-1-59807-070-5
- Passing the 7th Grade ARMT in Reading ISBN 978-1-59807-160-3
- Passing the 8th Grade ARMT in Reading ISBN 978-1-59807-039-2
- Passing the GA CRCT 3rd in Reading ISBN 978-1-59807-131-3
- Passing the GA CRCT 5th in Reading ISBN 978-1-59807-054-5
- Passing the GA CRCT 8th in Language Arts ISBN 978-1-59807-010-1
- Passing the GA CRCT 8th in Reading ISBN 978-1-59807-011-8
- Passing the GA Grade 8 Writing Assessment ISBN 978-1-59807-132-0
- Passing the New AL High School Graduation Exam in Language ISBN 978-1-59807-163-4
- Passing the New AL High School Graduation Exam in Reading ISBN 978-1-59807-164-1

American Book Company books are also listed as a resource by the New Jersey Department of Education and schools in many states, including Minnesota, California, and Alabama.
