= Thomas Saf-T-Liner =

Type D Thomas school bus model

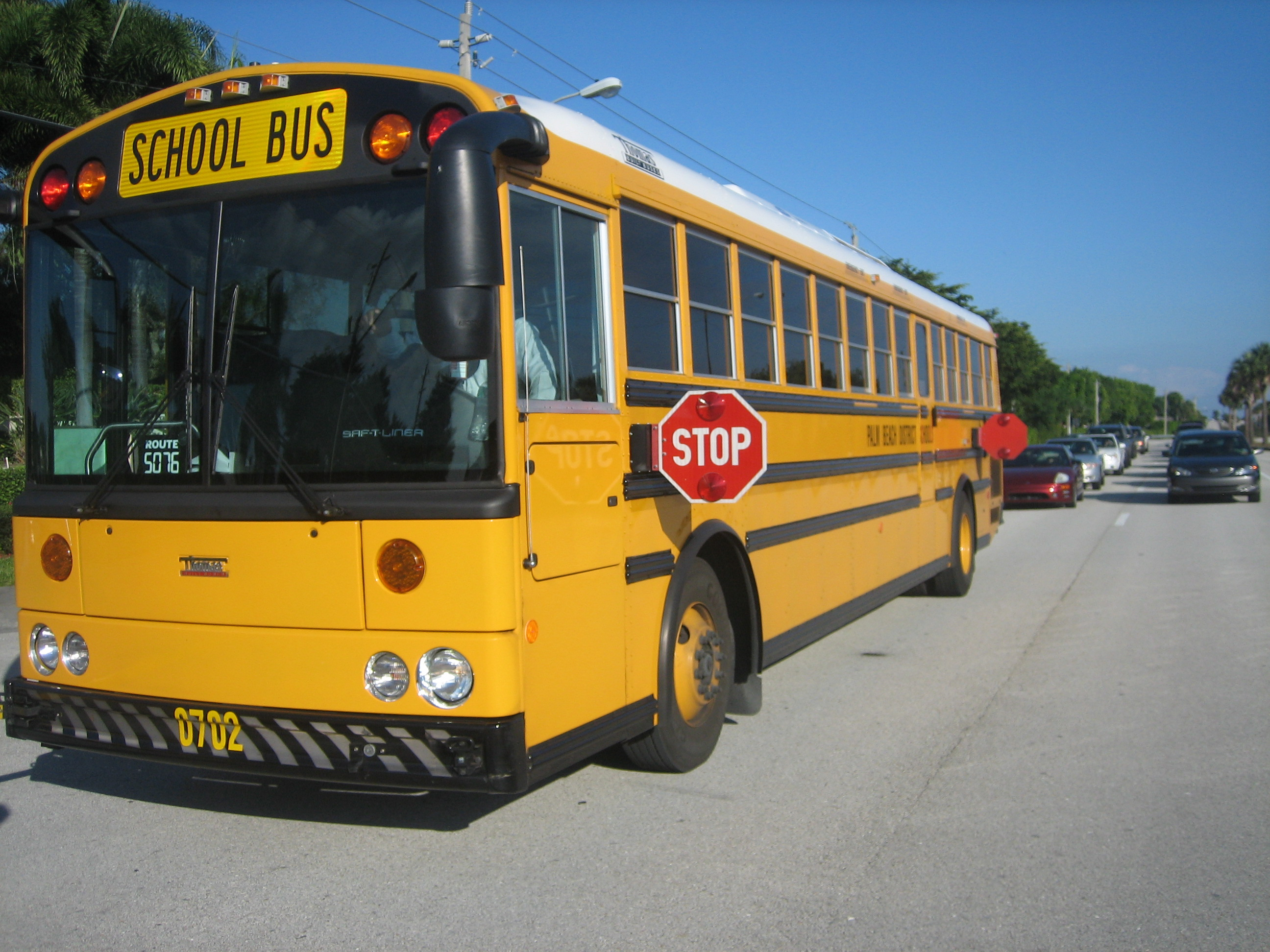
- Thomas Saf-T-Liner HDX

Overview
- Manufacturer: Thomas Built Buses (Freightliner)
- Production: 1972–present
- Assembly: United States: High Point, North Carolina (Thomas High Point Plant)

Body and chassis
- Class: Type D (transit-style)
- Body style: Monocoque stressed skin: School bus; Commercial bus
- Layout: front-engine 4x2 rear-engine 4x2 rear-engine 6x2 (discontinued)
- Chassis: Various (1972–1977); Thomas (1977–present)

Powertrain
- Engine: Diesel: Cummins, Detroit, & Mercedes-Benz; Compressed Natural Gas (CNG): Cummins (discontinued 2022)
- Transmission: Automatic

Dimensions
- Wheelbase: 181–277 inches (4.6–7.0 m) (HDX)
- Width: 96 inches (2.4 m)
- Curb weight: GVWR Up to 36,200 pounds (16,400 kg) (HDX)

The Thomas Saf-T-Liner is the name of the transit-style (Type D) school bus product line produced by Thomas Built Buses. It was originally introduced in 1972 using chassis from various manufacturers. Starting for the 1978 model year, the Saf-T-Liner marked the transition to in-house chassis production by Thomas. In addition to school bus applications, variations of the Saf-T-Liner have been produced as activity buses, specialty vehicles, and commercial/transit buses. It can also be used to describe the Saf-T-Liner C2 or Saf-T-Liner FS-65, but they are not considered part of the Saf-T-Liner family.

Currently, all versions of the Saf-T-Liner model line are produced in High Point, North Carolina.

== Design history ==
Prior to its reorganization as Thomas Built Buses in 1972, Thomas Car Works produced both front and rear-engined transit-style school buses to compete with other manufacturers. As was the common practice during the era, production of the chassis was outsourced to another manufacturer. Thomas offered its transit-style buses on a wide variety of chassis in comparison to other manufacturers (changing between Dodge, Ford, Chevrolet/GMC, International, and White). In contrast, Blue Bird, then the largest school bus manufacturer in the United States, manufactured its own chassis (as did West Coast manufacturer Gillig).

In May 1977, coinciding with an updated body design necessitated by federal school bus safety regulations, Thomas became a chassis manufacturer with the launch of the Saf-T-Liner EF (Engine Front), and the redesigned Saf-T-Liner ER (Engine Rear), first introduced in 1972. For the first time, the Saf-T-Liner was produced on a Thomas-designed chassis. In the late 1980s, the Saf-T-Liner product line (with the exception of the WestCoastER) adopted the MVP suffix, standing for Maneuverability, Visibility, and Protection.

== Current models ==
=== Saf-T-Liner HDX2 ===
In July 2024, Thomas Built Buses revamped the model into the Saf-T-Liner HDX2, which takes design cues from the Type C Saf-T-Liner C2, and whose bodies will be produced in the same Archdale, North Carolina, plant that produces the C2.

=== Saf-T-Liner eHDX2 "Wattson" ===
The Saf-T-Liner eHDX2, dubbed "Wattson", is an electric version of the Saf-T-Liner HDX2, announced by Thomas Built Buses in November 2025.

=== Saf-T-Liner EFX2 ===
In March 2025, Thomas Built Buses announced the new Saf-T-Liner EFX2 which, like the HDX2, takes design cues from the Saf-T-Liner C2. The bus will also be produced in the same facility as the C2 and HDX2. This marks the full transition of Type-D production to the Saf-T-Liner C2 Facility (now the Saf-T-Liner Facility).

== Discontinued models ==
=== Saf-T-Liner HDX ===
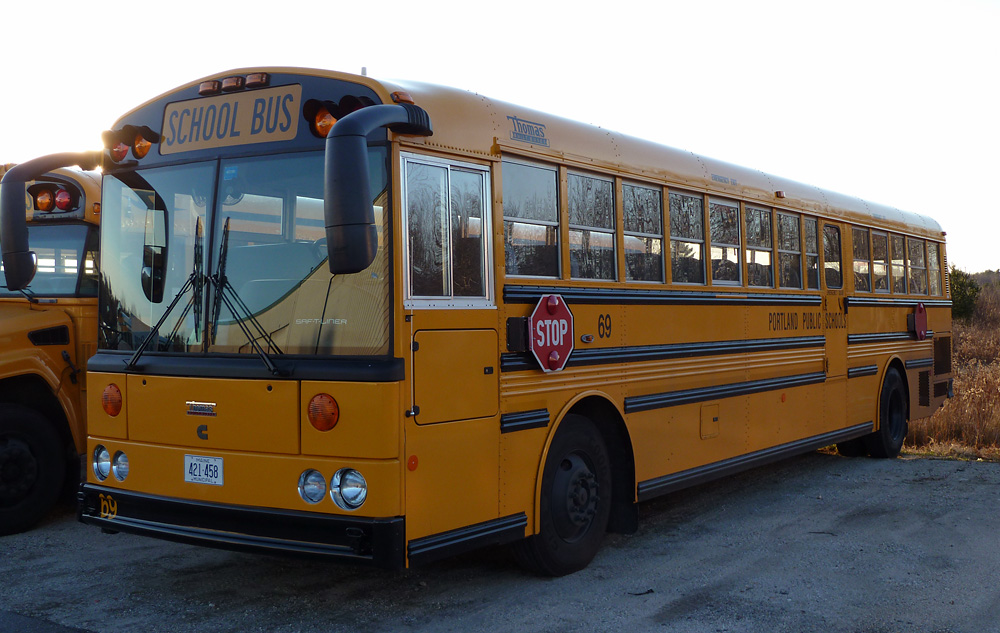
Thomas Saf-T-Liner HDX (CNG)

In 2000, Thomas introduced its new generation of rear-engine bus with the debut of the Thomas Saf-T-Liner HD (Heavy Duty); in 2002, the HD was re-branded as the HDX.

Serving as the replacement for the Saf-T-Liner ER and WestCoastER after 2002, the HD/HDX would use much of the same body, with the exception of the drivers' compartment forward. On the outside, the front roofcap was completely redesigned, fairing in the front warning lights; the "School Bus" lettering was changed to a reflective decal. In a move to increase visibility, the windshield was enlarged and reconfigured to a 2-piece curved configuration. A distinguishing feature of the redesign would be the design of the sideview mirrors. To improve forward sightlines, all three sets of sideview mirrors (flat, convex, and blind-spot crossview) were integrated into single roof-mounted units, eliminating a number of brackets.

Several parts of the redesign reflected the acquisition of Thomas by Freightliner. While the chassis remained a Thomas-produced unit, parts of the body were sourced from Freightliner, including the headlights (from the Century Class) and instrument panel (from the Business Class M2 and Sterling trucks). In a further move to improve visibility, the instrument panel was centrally mounted. Other changes were intended for the HD/HDX to accommodate a wide variety of bus drivers. The HD/HDX includes a fully adjustable driver's seat, a tilt/telescoping steering column, and an optional adjustable pedal cluster.

=== Saf-T-Liner EFX ===
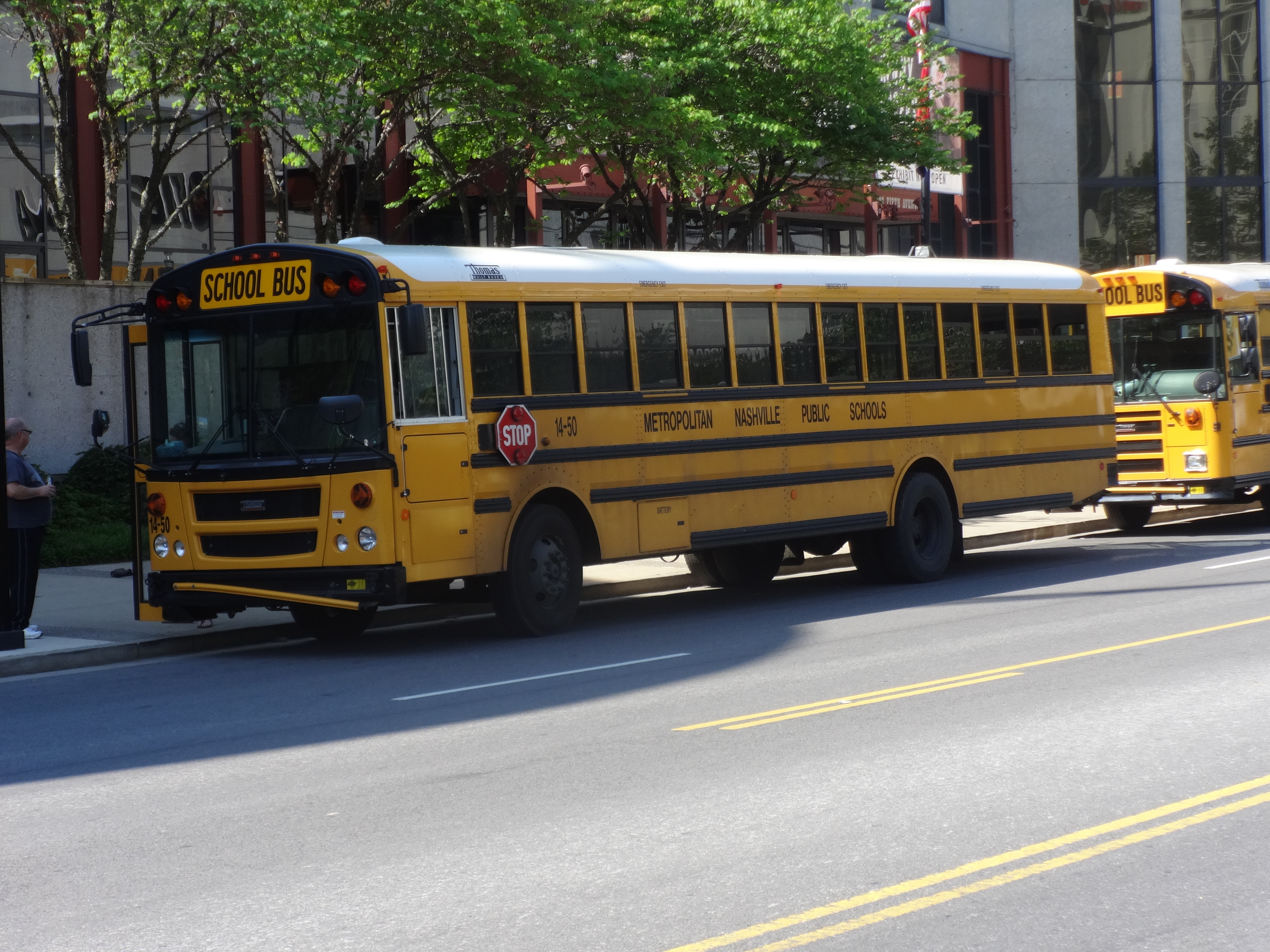
Thomas Saf-T-Liner EFX

In the fall of 2011, the Thomas Saf-T-Liner EF was given its most extensive redesign since 1991. As part of the redesign, it was re-branded the EFX, bringing its naming in line with the rear-engine HDX model. Production of the EFX began in the spring of 2012. Aside from the front grille, the EFX is also distinguished by its use of separate crossview mirrors instead of the integrated units seen on the HDX. Inside, the interior is sourced from the 2010 update of the EF; the gauge cluster (sourced from Freightliner) is now offset towards the center of the bus.

=== Saf-T-Liner EF ===
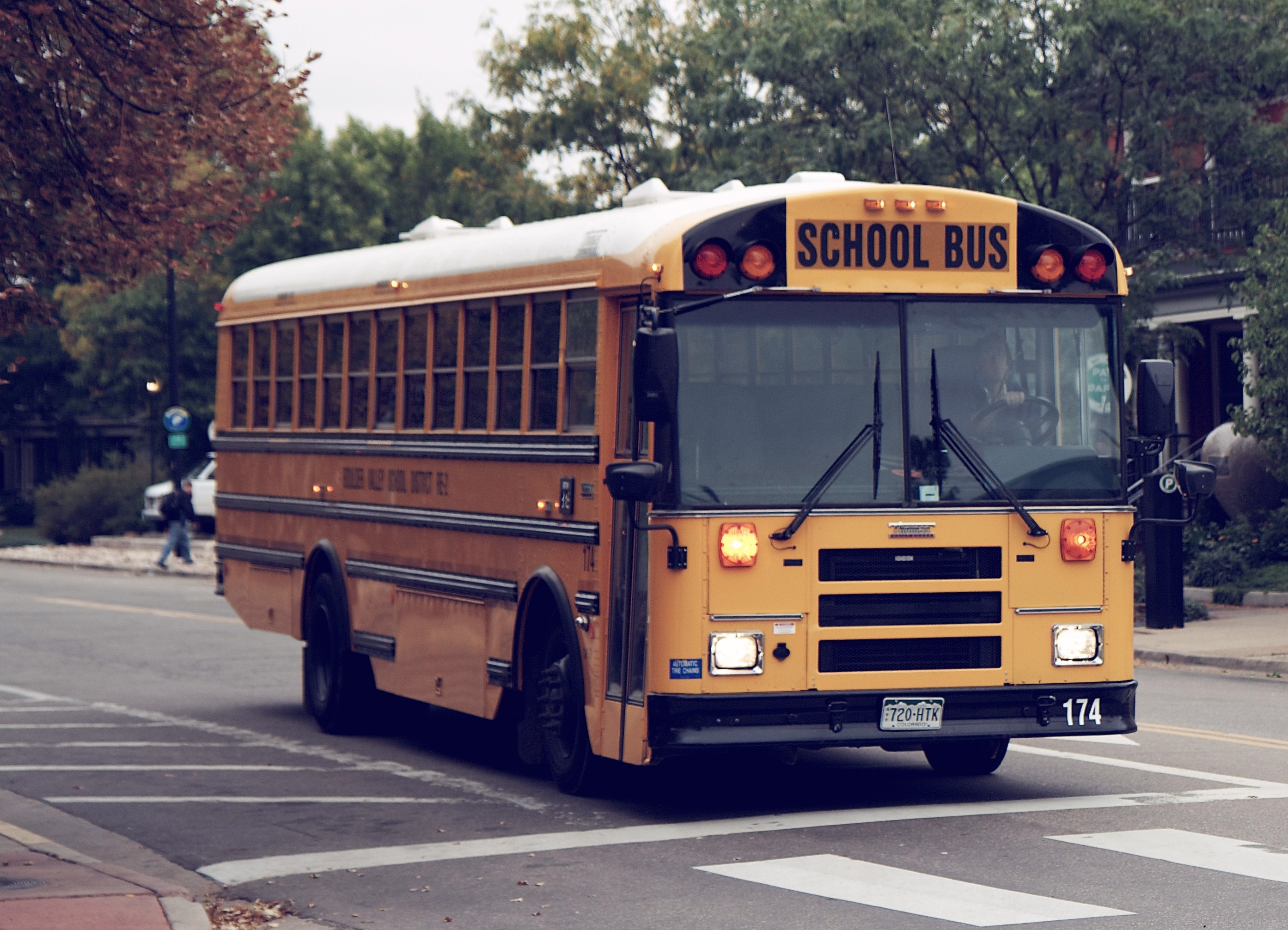
Thomas Saf-T-Liner EF (2007–2011 model)

Introduced in 1977 for the 1978 model year, this model underwent minor redesigns during the 1980s that reduced its chrome trim. In 1984, it received rectangular headlights. However, as lower-cost front-engine transits came onto the market in the late 1980s and early 1990s, this model was gradually replaced by the All Star EF and the Saf-T-Liner MVP EF. Today, the Saf-T-Liner EF name lives on as the MVP-series EF lost its prefix in 2006.

=== Saf-T-Liner MVP ===
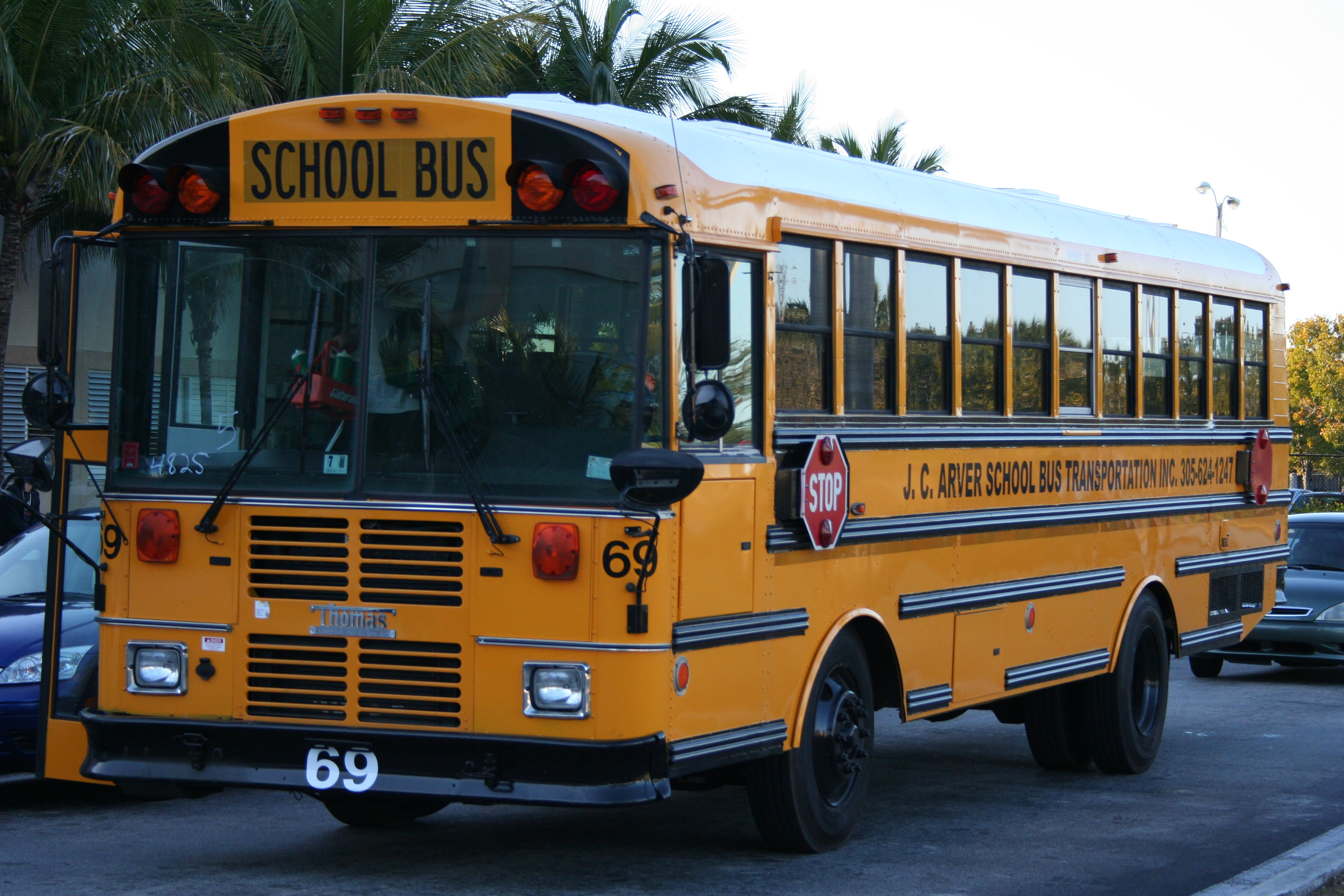
Thomas Saf-T-Liner MVP EF

Standing for Maneuverability, Visibility, and Protection, the MVP series of the Saf-T-Liner represented their first substantial update. Introduced as the new series "All-Star" for 1991, the MVP represented Thomas's entry into lower-cost Type D school buses, a segment created by the Blue Bird TC/2000 and Wayne Lifestar, originally based on Oshkosh chassis. It switched to began using the company's chassis for 1995. From the outside, the MVP EF and ER had much larger windshields, and updated drivers compartments. To distinguish them from the Saf-T-Liner ER, the MVP series had dual headlights instead of quad headlights. In 2002, the MVP ER was discontinued as Thomas replaced it with the Saf-T-Liner HDX. The MVP EF, with minor updates in 2006 and 2010, was produced until it was replaced by the EFX in 2012.

=== Saf-T-Liner ER ===
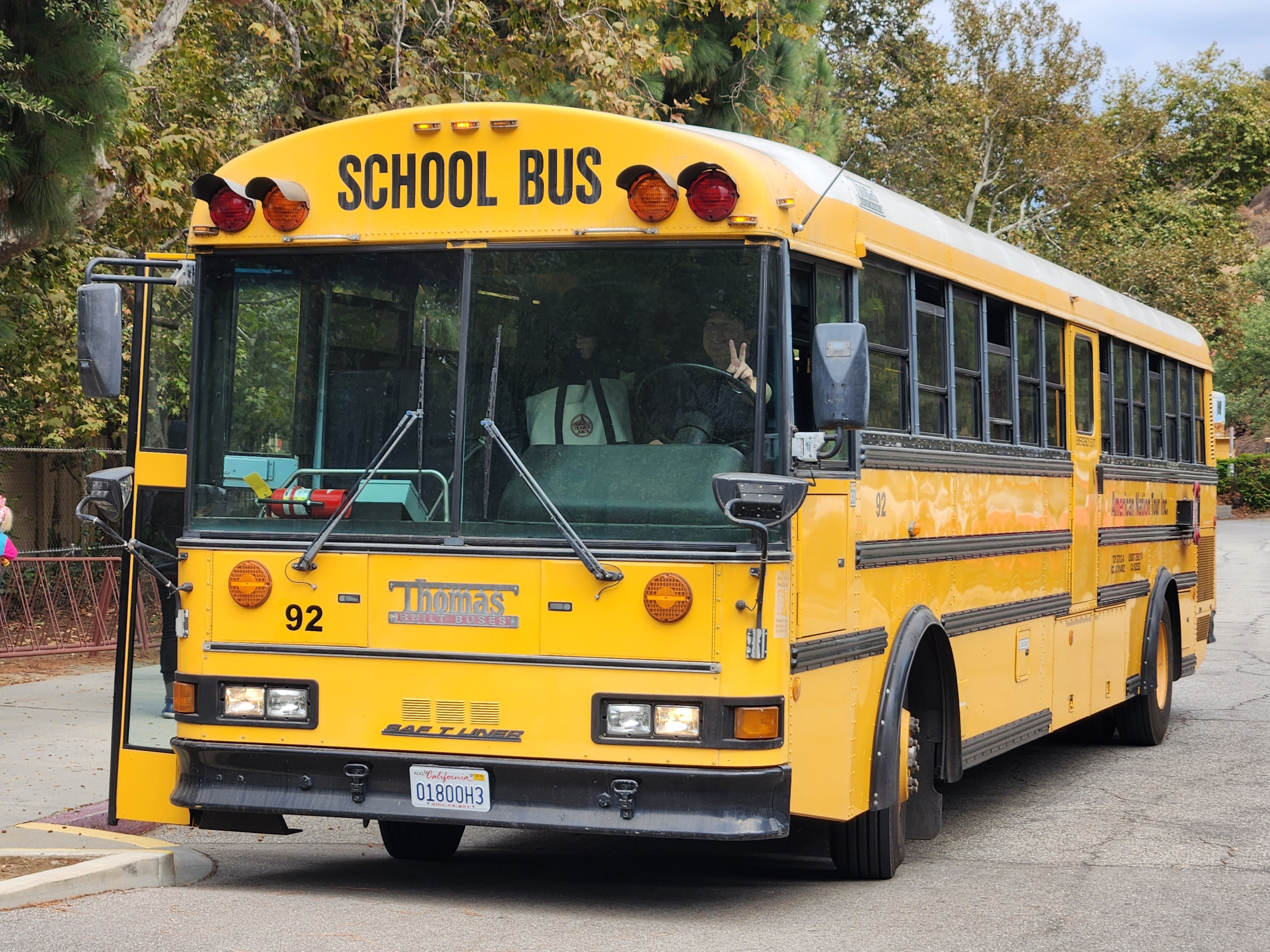
2003 Thomas Saf-T-Liner ER powered by CNG, operated by American Nation Tour.

Introduced in 1972, the ER was produced through the 1970s and 1980s with relatively few detail changes. In 1977, for the 1978 model year, the ER was given its own chassis from Thomas like the newly-launched EF. In 1984, the headlights and front turn signals were switched from round to rectangular units. In 1991, the driver's compartment was redesigned, with a much larger windshield. In 1997, this model was distinguished from MVP-series ERs by its optional black plastic headlight trim. In 2002, the ER was discontinued as Thomas replaced it and the Saf-T-Liner HD with the HDX.

==== WestCoast-ER ====
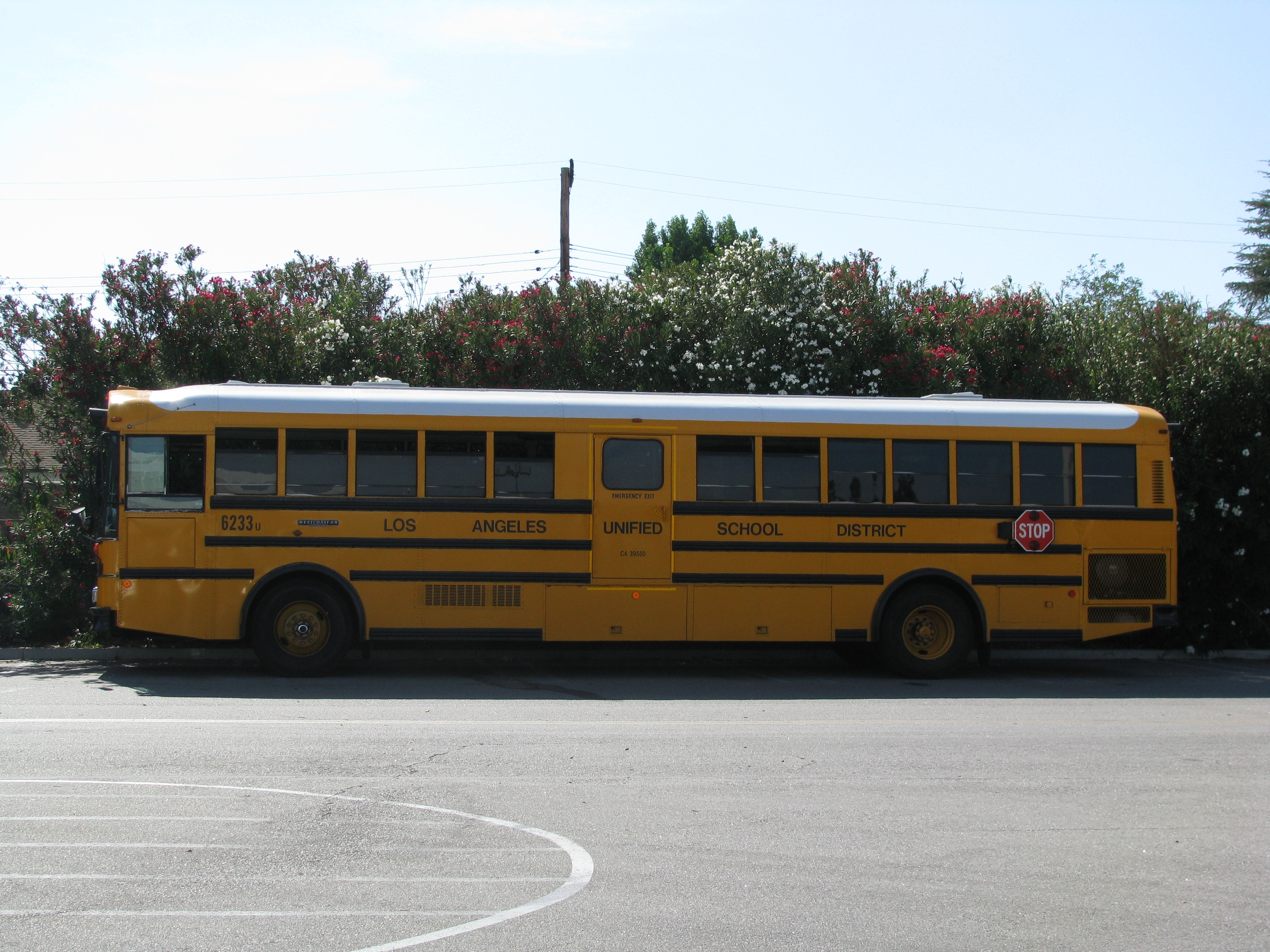
1991–1997 Thomas Saf-T-Liner (WestCoastER) operated by Los Angeles Unified School District.

Shortly after the introduction of the Saf-T-Liner ER, this variant was introduced by Thomas for West Coast markets (primarily California and Washington State). To better compete with the Crown Supercoaches and Gillig Transit Coaches that had long dominated West Coast school bus sales, Thomas upgraded the Saf-T-Liner ER with heavier-duty components; this upgrade was not made to the EF. Additionally, on 90-passenger models, a second rear axle was an option. As it was a regionally focused model, the WestCoast-ER did not sell in large numbers. However, as Crown Coach and Gillig both exited the school bus industry in the early 1990s, Thomas gained significant ground on the West Coast. In 1997, this model was also distinguished from MVP-series ERs by its optional black plastic headlight trim. In 2002, the WestCoast-ER was also replaced by Thomas with the HDX.

== Current model specifications ==
Both current models of the Saf-T-Liner are available with diesel engines, and have a maximum seating capacity of 90 passengers. The EFX is available with an Allison 2500 while the HDX is available with an Allison B300 or Voith transmission. The CNG engine option was discontinued in 2022 due to significant decline. Electric will become an option in the all-new HDX2, which will also retain the current diesel options.

Model Name	Saf-T-Liner EFX2	Saf-T-Liner HDX2 Saf-T-Liner eHDX2 "Wattson"
Seating Capacity	to 90	to 90
Body Width (exterior)	96 inches (2.4 m)	
Wheelbase	136–231 inches (3.5–5.9 m)	189–273 inches (4.8–6.9 m)
Interior Headroom	78 inches (2.0 m)	
GVWR	Up to 36,200 pounds (16,400 kg)	
Fuel type(s)	Diesel	Diesel; Electric
Engine	Cummins B6.7 (2025–present) (220–300 hp or 160–220 kW)	Cummins B6.7 (2024–present) (220–300 hp or 160–220 kW); Cummins L9 (diesel) (260–300 hp or 190–220 kW)

== Discontinued model specifications ==
The discontinued models of the Saf-T-Liner were available with diesel engines (or optional natural gas engine in the ER), and have a maximum seating capacity of 90 passengers.

Model Name	Saf-T-Liner EFX	Saf-T-Liner HD Saf-T-Liner HDX
Seating Capacity	to 90	to 90
Body Width (exterior)	96 inches (2.4 m)	
Wheelbase	136–231 inches (3.5–5.9 m)	189–273 inches (4.8–6.9 m)
Interior Headroom	78 inches (2.0 m)	
GVWR	Up to 36,200 pounds (16,400 kg)	
Fuel type(s)	Diesel	Diesel; Compressed Natural Gas (CNG) (2000–2022)
Engine	Cummins ISB 6.7 (2012–2017) (220–300 hp or 160–220 kW); Cummins B6.7 (2017–2025) (220–300 hp or 160–220 kW)	Cummins ISB 5.9L (diesel/natural gas; 2000–2007) (220–300 hp or 160–220 kW); Cummins ISB 6.7 (2007–2017) (220–300 hp or 160–220 kW); Cummins B6.7 (2017–2024) (220–300 hp or 160–220 kW); Cummins ISC 8.3L (diesel) (260–300 hp or 190–220 kW); Cummins L9N (250–280 hp or 186–208) (discontinued); Cummins ISL-G CNG (250–280 hp or 190–210 kW) (discontinued); Cummins ISL 8.9L (diesel) (260–300 hp or 190–220 kW); Cummins L9 (diesel/CNG; 2017–2024) (260–300 hp or 190–220 kW); Caterpillar 3126/C7 (2000–2010) (260–300 hp or 190–220 kW); 8.1L John Deere I6 (natural gas) (2000–200?) (250–280 hp or 190–210 kW); Mercedes-Benz MBE926 (2000–2010) (250 hp or 190 kW); Detroit Diesel DD8 (2018–2024) (260–300 hp or 190–220 kW)

Model Name	Saf-T-Liner EF Saf-T-Liner MVP EF	Saf-T-Liner ER Saf-T-Liner MVP ER Saf-T-Liner WestCoast-ER
Seating Capacity	to 90	to 90
Body Width (exterior)	96 inches (2.4 m)	
Wheelbase	136–231 inches (3.5–5.9 m)	189–273 inches (4.8–6.9 m)
Interior Headroom	78 inches (2.0 m)	
GVWR	Up to 36,200 pounds (16,400 kg)	
Fuel type(s)	Diesel	Gasoline; Diesel; Compressed Natural Gas (CNG)
Engine	Cummins ISB 5.9L (1998–2007) (220–300 hp or 160–220 kW); Cummins ISB 6.7 (2007–2012) (200–260 hp or 150–190 kW); Cummins ISC 8.3L (260–300 hp or 190–220 kW); Caterpillar 3208 V8 (260–300 hp or 190–220 kW); Caterpillar 3116 (260–300 hp or 190–220 kW); Caterpillar 3126/C7 (200–260 hp or 150–190 kW)	Cummins VT555 V8 (diesel) (1982–1989) (260–300 hp or 190–220 kW); Cummins ISB 5.9L (diesel/natural gas; 1998–2002) (220–300 hp or 160–220 kW); Cummins ISC 8.3L (diesel) (260–300 hp or 190–220 kW); Caterpillar 3208 V8 (diesel) (1982–1995) (260–300 hp or 190–220 kW); Caterpillar 3116 (diesel) (260–300 hp or 190–220 kW); Caterpillar 3126 (diesel) (260–300 hp or 190–220 kW); 8.1L John Deere I6 (natural gas) (1997–2002) (250–280 hp or 190–210 kW); Detroit Diesel 6-71/6L71/6N71 (1982–1991) (260–300 hp or 190–220 kW); Detroit Diesel 6V92 (1982–1995) (260–300 hp or 190–220 kW)

== Commercial use ==
Alongside the Saf-T-Liner C2, the EFX and HDX are also produced for commercial applications; Thomas uses the Transit Liner name for its commercial model lines. The replacements for the TL960 and Transit Liner MVP, the Transit Liner EFX/HDX share much of their bodies with the Saf-T-Liner, differing in their windows and seating.

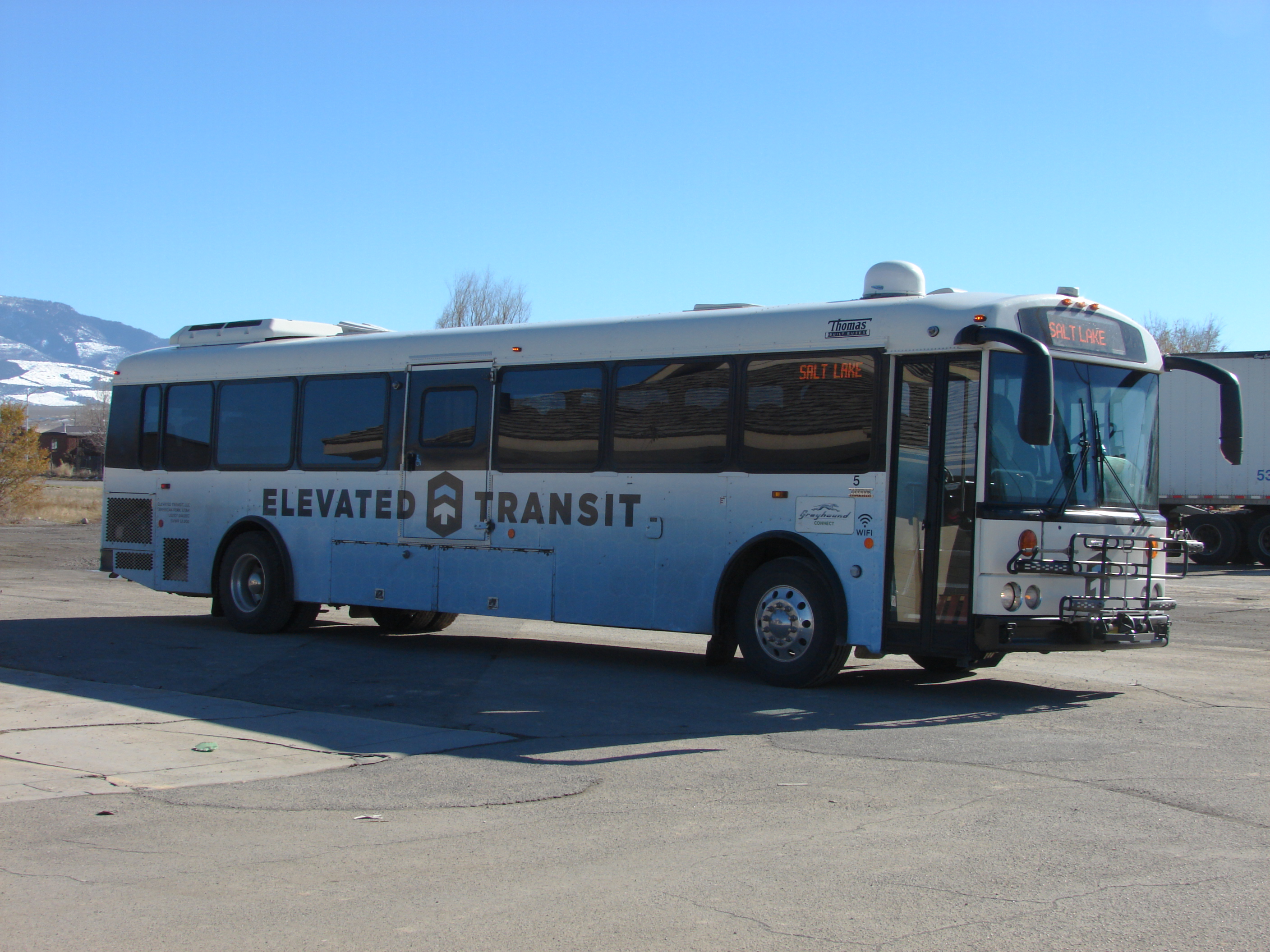
Thomas Transit Liner HDX

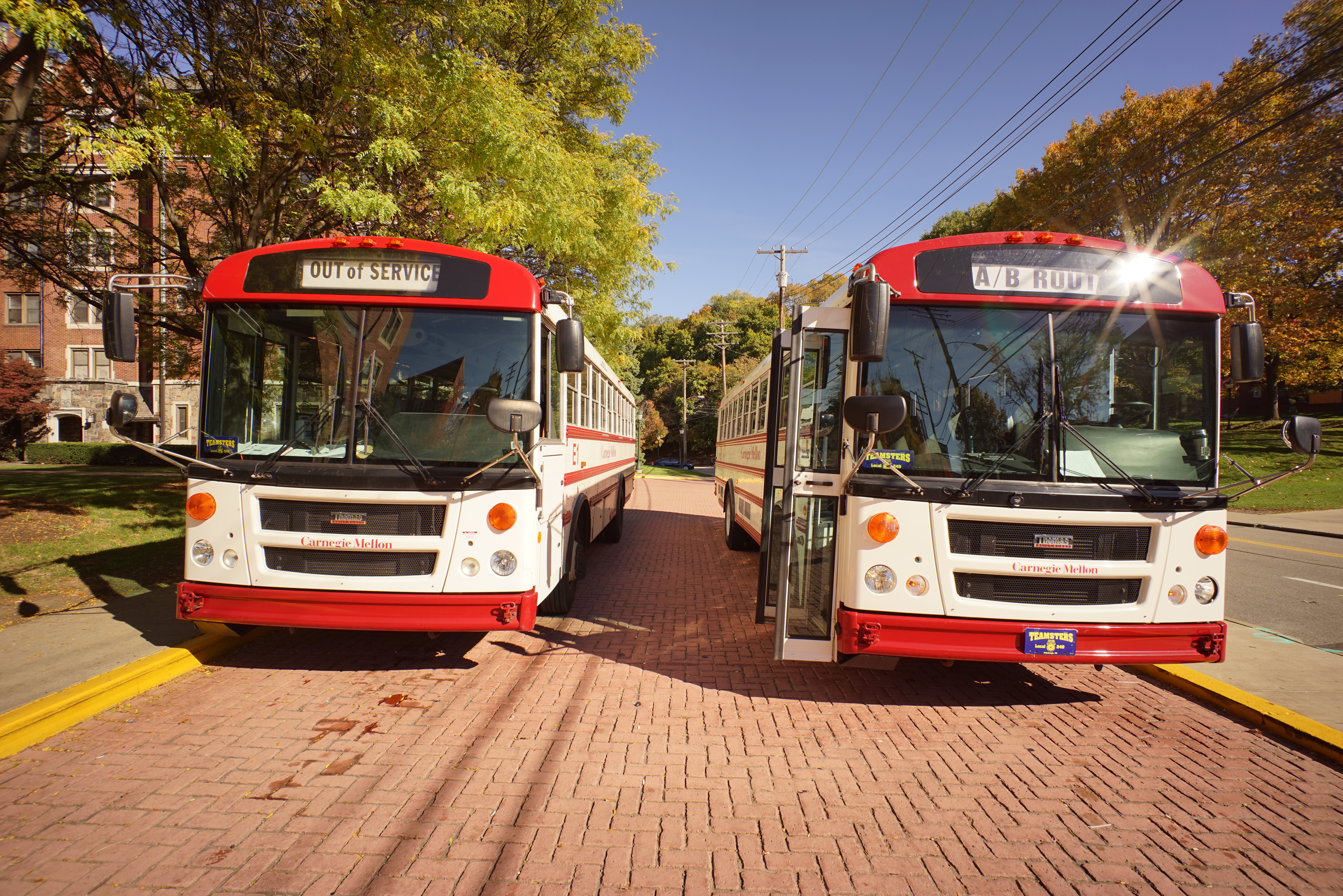
Thomas Transit Liner EFX

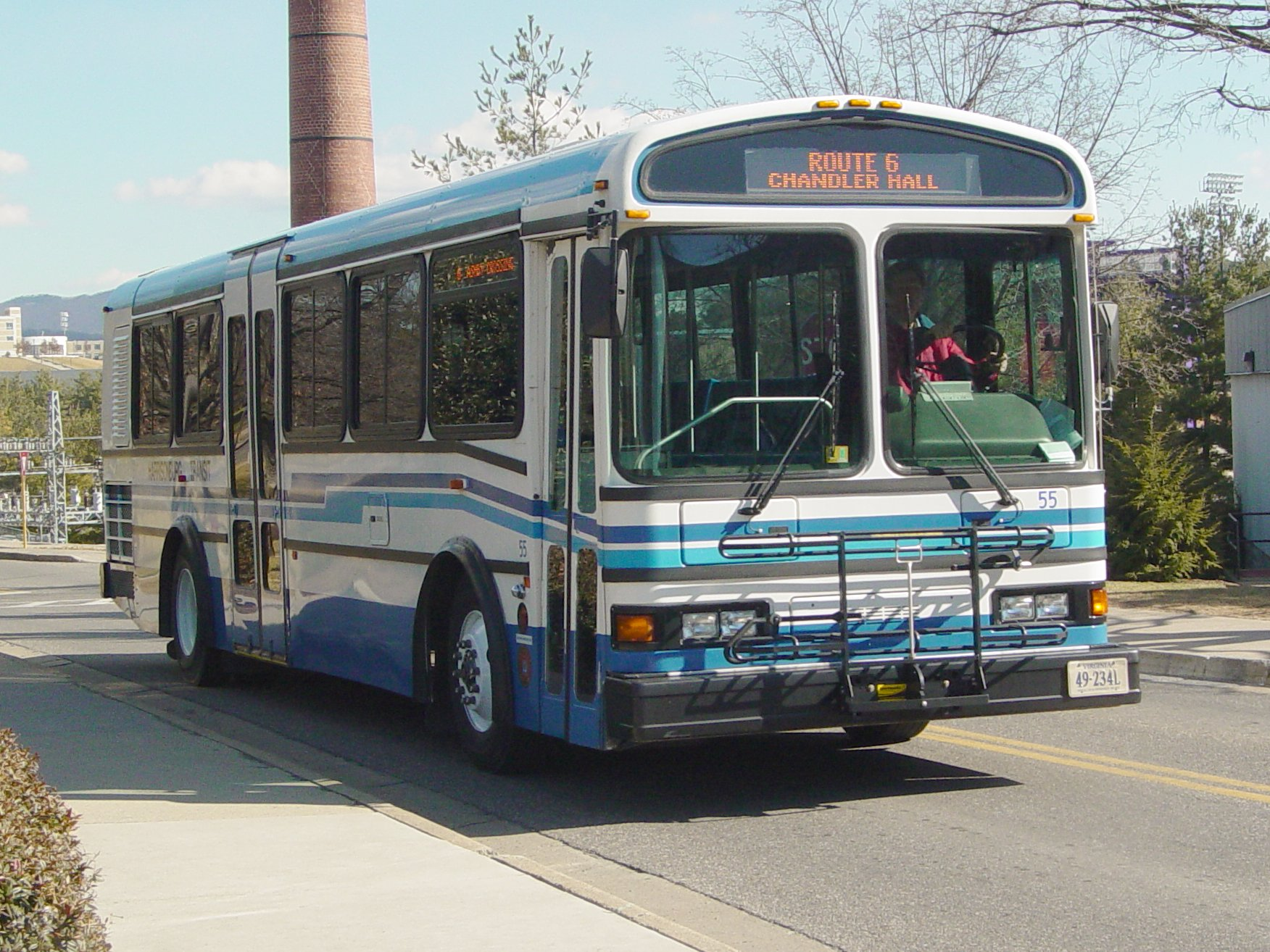
Thomas TL960

== See also ==
- Blue Bird All American
- Blue Bird TC/2000
- IC Bus FE Series
- IC Bus RE Series
- Wayne Lifestar
