= OCC Transport =

Transportation service at Binghamton University

Off Campus College Transport, Inc.
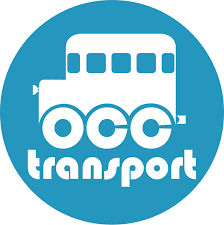
- Parent: Student Association of Binghamton University, Inc.
- Founded: 1971
- Headquarters: Vestal, NY
- Service area: Broome County
- Service type: Bus Transit
- Routes: 16 regular routes; 5 late night routes
- Fleet: Thomas Saf-T-Liner C2; Coach & Equipment Phoenix Ford; Chrysler Voyager (Lift)
- Fuel type: Diesel, Liquid Propane, Gasoline
- Manager: McKenzie Skrastins
- Website: www.occtransport.org

Off Campus College Transport, Inc., or OCCT, is Binghamton University's student driven, managed, and operated bus service for Binghamton University students, faculty, and staff. OCCT offers "safe, reliable, convenient, consistent, and courteous transportation to the Binghamton University community." OCCT offers additional services such as Lift service for passengers with disabilities and Charter services for organizations and groups associated with Binghamton University. The transportation service is provided at no additional cost to students, although service is paid for through fees collected with tuition. The Company is a wholly owned subsidiary of The Student Association of Binghamton University, Inc.

== History ==
OCCT from its founding was run as a fully democratic, student-owned and operated cooperative until 1995. That summer, a lock-out followed when the student cooperative voted to shut down during the summer until the university administration backed off of its attempts to install a new coordinator.

The organization is currently run by a full-time Director. The Board of Directors consists of both voting and non-voting members from the Student Association of Binghamton University, Inc. and the Binghamton University administration. Funding for service is provided by the student transportation fee, which is collected with tuition, by the Student Association, and by the Graduate Student Organization. The Board of Directors is chaired by the Student Association Vice President for Finance. In 2015, OCCT released an app, ETA SPOT, to provide real time tracking for their bus service.

== Routes ==
OCCT services the campus and has routes throughout Vestal, Binghamton, and Johnson City.

- Campus Shuttle (CS)
- Downtown Center-Leroy Outbound (DCL OUT)
- Downtown Center-Leroy Inbound (DCL IN)
- Downtown Express (DE)
- Downtown Southside Outbound (DS OUT)
- Downtown Southside Inbound (DS IN)
- ITC Shuttle (ITC)
- ITC-Campus Shuttle (ICS)
- ITC-UClub Shuttle (IU)
- Main Street Outbound (MS OUT)
- Main Street Inbound (MS IN)
- Oakdale Commons Shuttle (OC)
- Vestal Shopping Shuttle (VS)
- UClub Shuttle (UC)
- UDC Shuttle (UDC)
- Westside Outbound (WS OUT)
- Westside Inbound (WS IN)

== Fleet ==
=== Current fleet ===
- 2018, 2020-2022 Thomas Saf-T-Liner C2 Powertrain Integration 8.0L
- 2014, 2017, 2023 Thomas Saf-T-Liner C2 Cummins 6.7L
- 2016-2018 Coach & Equipment Ford E-450 18 Passenger Shuttle Bus 6.8L
- 2022 Chrysler Voyager BraunAbility Side Load Wheelchair Minivan

=== Retired Fleet ===
- 2015, 2016 Thomas Saf-T-Liner C2 Cummins 6.7L
- 2011-2012 Champion Bus Incorporated Freightliner M2 Defender Cummins 6.7L
- 2012 Mobility Ventures MV-1
- 2008 Ford E-350 ElDorado Aerotech (Lift) 6.8L
- 2003-2006 Thomas Saf-T-Liner HDX
- Thomas Saf-T-Liner ER
- Thomas Saf-T-Liner TL960
- 2012 Vehicle Production Group MV-1

== Administrative vehicles ==
- Chevrolet Silverado
- Toyota RAV4 Hybrid
- Ford Fusion
- Chrysler Voyager
- Chevrolet Malibu
- 2009 Chevrolet Express 12 Passenger 6.0L
