= Lexile =

Educational tool for measuring readability level

- Creator: MetaMetrics
- Website: hub.lexile.com

The Lexile Framework for Reading is an educational tool in the United States that uses a measure called a Lexile to match readers with reading resources such as books and articles. Readers and texts are assigned a Lexile score, where lower scores reflect easier readability for texts and lower reading ability for readers. Lexile scores are assigned based on individual words and sentence length, rather than qualitative analysis of the content. Thus, Lexile scores do not reflect multiple levels of textual meaning or the maturity of the content. The United States Common Core State Standards recommend the use of alternative, qualitative methods to select books for grade 6 and above. In the U.S., Lexile measures are reported annually from reading programs and assessments. According to LightSail Education, about half of U.S. students in grades 3-12 receive a Lexile measure each year. The Georgia Department of Education provides resources for using Lexile measures.

== Components of the Lexile framework ==
The Lexile Framework is made up of Lexile reader measures and Lexile text measures, both of which are put on the Lexile scale.

=== Lexile scale ===
The Lexile scale runs from BR300 (Lexile) to above 2000L, though there is not an explicit bottom or top to the scale. Scores 0L and below are reported as BR (Beginning Reader). These books or students may be coded as Lexile: BR. In some cases, a student will receive a BR code followed by a number (e.g. Lexile: BR150L). A measure of BR150L indicates that the Lexile measure is 150 units below 0L.

=== Lexile measure ===
A Lexile measure is defined as "the numeric representation of an individual's reading ability or a text's readability (or difficulty), followed by an 'L' (Lexile)". There are two types of Lexile measures: Lexile reader measures and Lexile text measures. Reader measures are assigned to individuals based on their reading comprehension for a piece of text. Text measures are assigned to a piece of text based on the text's vocabulary and syntax. According to MetaMetrics, text measures are evaluated through the "Lexile Analyzer", a computer program that assigns a score based on vocabulary and syntax. MetaMetrics states that over 150 publishers, including Capstone Publishers, Discovery Ed, Houghton Mifflin Harcourt, McGraw-Hill, Pearson PLC, Riverside Publishing, Scholastic Corporation, Simon & Schuster, Workman Publishing Company, and World Book, offer certified Lexile text measures for their materials.

According to MetaMetrics, Lexile text measures can assist in selecting appropriately challenging materials for readers.

=== Lexile codes ===
Some books receive Lexile codes—two-letter designations that appear before the Lexile measure—to provide additional context about developmental appropriateness, reading difficulty, and intended use. BR is the only code that applies to both readers and text.

Code	Meaning	Book information	Example	Lexile measure
AD	Adult-directed	Picture books that are usually read to a child	Maurice Sendak's Where the Wild Things Are	AD740L
NC	Non-Conforming	Books with a Lexile measure markedly higher than is typical for the publisher's intended audience	Seymour Simon's Amazing Aircraft	NC710L
HL	High-Low	Books with a Lexile measure much lower than the average reading ability of the intended age range of its readers	Beth Goobie's Sticks and Stones	HL430L
IG	Illustrated guide	Books that consist of independent pieces or sections of text that could be moved around without affecting the overall linear flow of the book	Dr. Gerald Legg's Birds of Prey	IG320L
GN	Graphic novel	Graphic novel or comic book where the majority of the text appears as voice in thought bubbles	Siena Cherson Siegel's To Dance: A Ballerina's Graphic Novel	GN610L
BR	Beginning reader	Books or readers with a Lexile measure below 0L	Don Curry's Fall Leaves	BR20L
NP	Non-prose	Book comprising more than 50% non-standard or non-conforming prose, whose text cannot be assigned a Lexile measure	Maurice Sendak's Alligators All Around	NP

== History ==
The Lexile framework was created in 1989 by MetaMetrics. From 1984 to 1996, MetaMetrics received funding through five grants from Small Business Innovation Research, obtained through the National Institutes of Health, to develop a measurement system for reading and writing.

The measurement ideas embedded in the Lexile framework can be found in two 1982–83 articles by Stenner and Smith.

== Independent evaluations ==
In Mesmer's Tools for Matching Readers to Texts: Research Based Practices, a 2006 study by Walpole et al. is described, in which 47 second-graders were assigned texts based on their Lexile scores. The study found that the students could read texts at their assigned Lexile scores (93%), but also noted that 43% of the sampled books were below a basic standard for 2nd grade. Mesmer concludes that "Lexile scores and book levels may not help teachers in finding books that can be read fluently" and lists the cost of using the Lexile inventory tools as a disadvantage.

In 2001, the National Center for Educational Statistics (NCES) published a review of Lexile measures, concluding that the framework is an improvement over traditional reading measures, while also noting the omission of factors such as reader motivation, interest, and knowledge. The review affirmed the value of sentence length and word frequency as measures of complexity but also stated that these metrics are an estimated correlate of readability. The NCES concluded that while other work on text metrics may be more useful, Lexile scores are easier to analyze.

In 2001, Stephen Krashen published an article arguing that the Lexile Framework was potentially harmful in limiting students' reading choices and that the resources spent on it might be better spent on books.

In a paper titled "Interpreting Lexiles in Online Contexts and with Informational Texts", Elfrieda H. Hiebert concluded that the variability of Lexile scores within the same text can be extensive and that slight changes in punctuation can result in "significant reclassification" on the Lexile scale.

== Common core standards ==
U.S. Common Core State Standards for English Language Arts states that Lexile scores can be used to help determine text complexity levels for students. The standards also note that quantitative methods like Lexile may underestimate the challenges of complex narrative fiction and that qualitative measures should be prioritized for students in grade 6 and above.

== Examples of books with Lexile measures ==
Title	Author	Lexile
Green Eggs and Ham	Dr. Seuss	210L
Clifford the Big Red Dog	Norman Bridwell	370L
The Very Hungry Caterpillar	Eric Carle	AD460L
The Giving Tree	Shel Silverstein	530L
The Sun Also Rises	Ernest Hemingway	610L
Charlotte's Web	E. B. White	680L
Twilight	Stephenie Meyer	720L
A Farewell to Arms	Ernest Hemingway	730L
Harry Potter and the Sorcerer's Stone	J. K. Rowling	880L
A Tale of Two Cities	Charles Dickens	990L
The Hobbit	J. R. R. Tolkien	1000L
Pride and Prejudice	Jane Austen	1190L
A Brief History of Time	Stephen Hawking	1290L
Robinson Crusoe	Daniel Defoe	1360
Rob Roy	Walter Scott	1560L

More examples are available here.

== Use ==
Lexile measures are reported by various reading assessments and programs.

=== Reading assessments that report Lexile measures ===
Source: State assessments

- Arizona's Instrument to Measure Standards (AIMS)
- California English-Language Arts Standards Test
- Delaware Comprehensive Assessment System
- Florida Assessments for Instruction in Reading (FAIR)
- Georgia Georgia Milestones and the Georgia High School Graduation Test (GM and GHSGT)
- Hawaii State Assessment
- Illinois Standards Achievement Test (ISAT)
- Kansas State Assessments of Reading
- Kentucky Core Curriculum Test (KCCT)
- Minnesota Comprehensive Assessments (MCA)
- New Mexico Standards-Based Assessment (SBA)
- North Carolina End-of-Grade and English I End-of-Course (NCEOG and NCEOC)
- Oklahoma Core Curriculum Test (OCCT)
- Oregon Assessment of Knowledge and Skills (OAKS)
- South Carolina Palmetto Assessment of State Standards (PASS)
- South Dakota State Test of Educational Progress (DSTEP)
- Tennessee Comprehensive Assessment Program (TCAP) Achievement Test
- Texas Assessment of Knowledge and Skills (TAKS)
- Virginia Standards of Learning Tests (SOL)
- West Virginia WESTEST 2
- Proficiency Assessments for Wyoming Students (PAWS)
