= Tulsa Bus Plant =

School bus plant in Tulsa, Oklahoma, U.S.

Coordinates: 36°11′30″N 95°52′24″W

- Built: 1941
- Operated: 2001–present
- Location: 2322 North Mingo Road; Tulsa, Oklahoma, United States
- Industry: Automotive
- Products: school buses
- Employees: 1,200
- Volume: 1,000,000 square feet (93,000 m^{2})
- Owner: International Motors

Tulsa Bus Plant is a IC Bus manufacturing plant in Tulsa, Oklahoma, owned by International Motors.

== History ==
The plant was originally opened in 1941 by Douglas Aircraft to assemble bombers for World War II.

In December 1999, Navistar International announced a $45 million plan to open a second AmTran school bus manufacturing plant in Tulsa, Oklahoma, for the production of a new Type C integrated conventional, the International IC. The plant was opened on June 5, 2001 with approximately 400 employees and one vehicle produced daily. International announced plans to increase production to 15 vehicles per day due to demand.

In January 2005, the Tulsa, Oklahoma, bus plant plant employs more than 950 workers.

On June 5, 2012, the Tulsa, Oklahoma IC Bus assembly plant produced its 100,000th vehicle. In February 2013, about 650 workers at the IC Bus manufacturing plant in Tulsa, Oklahoma, voted to join the United Auto Workers (UAW), creating UAW Local 5010.

In November 2016, IC Bus laid off 75 hourly workers at the plant due to seasonal shifts in the school bus manufacturing cycle.

On October 21, 2025, the Tulsa Bus Plant produced its 250,000th vehicle.

== Products made ==
- International IC/IC CE (2001–present)
- IC RE (2008?–2024)
- IC BE (2005–2015)
- IC AE (2010–2015)
