= Jeremiah Service House =

Historic house in Indiana, United States

- Jeremiah H. Service House
- U.S. National Register of Historic Places
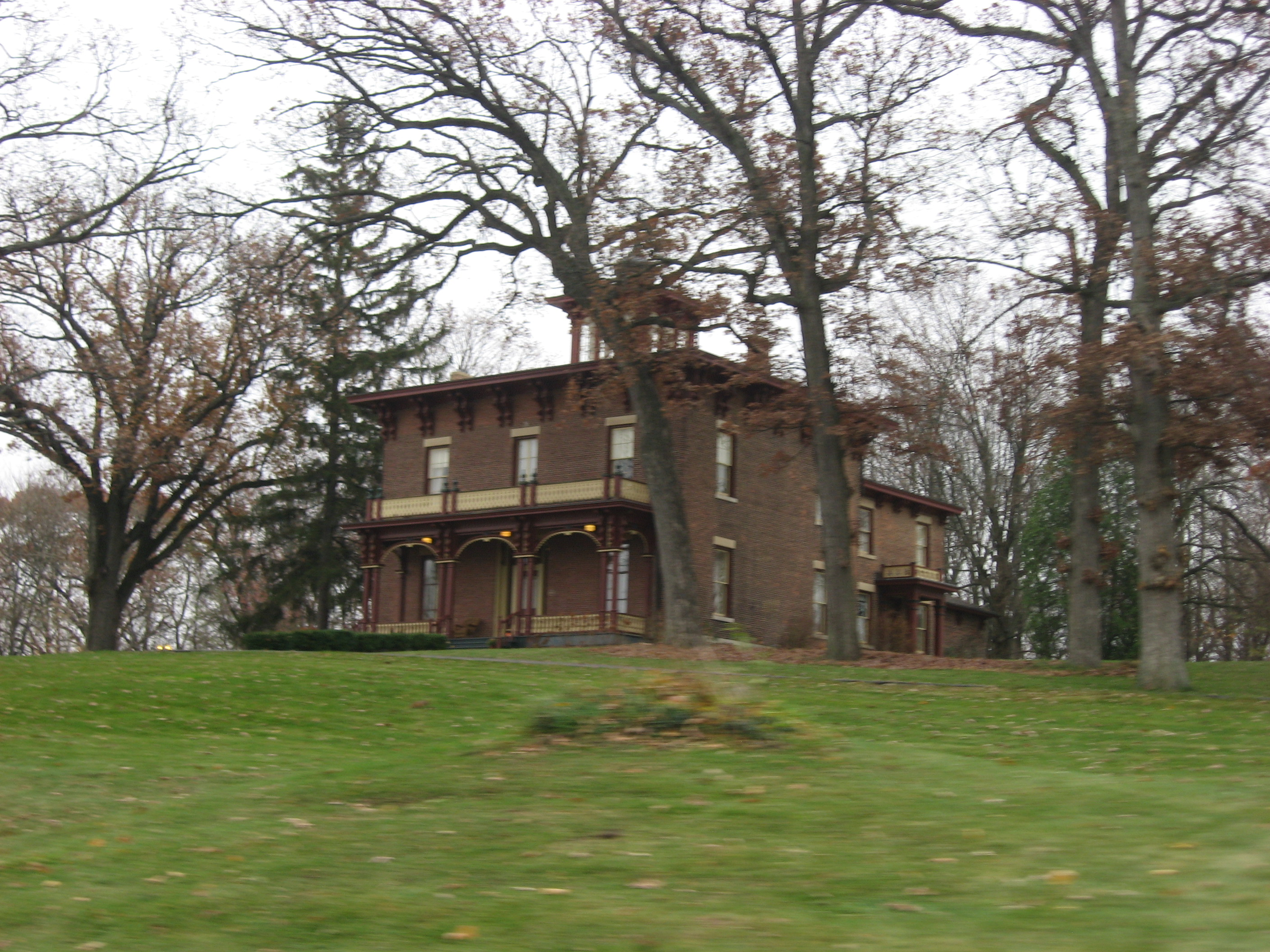
- Jeremiah Service House, November 2013

- Location within Indiana Location within the United States
- Location: 302 E. Michigan St., New Carlisle, Indiana
- Coordinates: 41°42′22″N 86°30′16″W
- Area: 3.7 acres (1.5 ha)
- Built: 1860-1861
- Architectural style: Italianate, Exotic Revival
- NRHP reference No.: 00000216
- Added to NRHP: March 15, 2000

Jeremiah H. Service House, also known as Old Republic, is a historic home located at New Carlisle, Indiana. It was built in 1860–1861, and is a two-story, square plan, Italianate style brick dwelling with additions. It features a full-width front porch, paired scroll-sawn brackets, and a central cupola topped by Turkish-style onion dome. Also on the property are the contributing ice house and smokehouse.

It was listed on the National Register of Historic Places in 2000.
