= North Carolina End of Grade Tests =

Standardized educational tests in a U.S. state

The North Carolina End of Grade Tests are the standardized tests given to students in grades 3 to 8 in North Carolina. Beyond grade 8, there are End of Course Tests for students in grades 9 to 12. The EOG is given to test skills in mathematics, English, and science. Students in grades 3 to 8 must take the mathematics and English End of Grade Tests. Students in grades 5 and 8 must take all three.

Achievement levels are measured through levels of proficiency, and it differs depending on what grade a student is in. The scores are given as Not Proficient( 1 and 2) 3, 4, or 5. A score of 4 or 5 means that a student is proficient in the subject and on track to meet college standards and expectations. A score of 3 means that a student is proficient in the subject but is not on track to meet college standards and expectations. A score of 1 or 2 means that a student is not proficient in the subject and is not on track to meet college standards and expectations. Students that meet a 1 or 2 score are allowed to take a second chance on the test.

== Cut Scores ==
Cut scores are what determine the achievement score a student receives. These are measured for each grade level and subject as follows:

Mathematics
Grade	Cut Score	Achievement Level
3	< 544 545-550 551-559 > 560	2 3 4 5
4	< 546 547-551 552-559 > 560	2 3 4 5
5	< 545 546-550 551-560 > 561	2 3 4 5
6	< 545 546-550 551-560 > 561	2 3 4 5
7	< 545 546-549 550-559 > 560	2 3 4 5
8	< 542 543-547 548-554 > 555	2 3 4 5

English
Grade	Cut Score	Achievement Level
3	< 539 540-545 546-550 > 551	2 3 4 5
4	< 543 544-547 548-555 > 556	2 3 4 5
5	< 549 550-553 554-559 > 560	2 3 4 5
6	< 551 552-557 558-566 > 567	2 3 4 5
7	< 553 554-558 559-565 > 566	2 3 4 5
8	< 556 557-562 563-571 > 572	2 3 4 5

Science
Grade	Cut Score	Achievement Level
5	< 248 249-251 252-262 > 263	2 3 4 5
8	< 244 245-247 248-259 > 260	2 3 4 5

== See also ==
- List of state achievement tests in the United States
