= South Dakota State Test of Educational Progress =

The South Dakota State Test of Educational Progress (DSTEP) is a standards-based test designed to meet NCLB requirements. Grades 3-8 and 11 are tested.

The DSTEP reports out Lexile measures for each student. A Lexile measure can be used to match readers with targeted text and monitor growth in reading ability.
