= IC Bus RE Series =

Type D IC school bus model

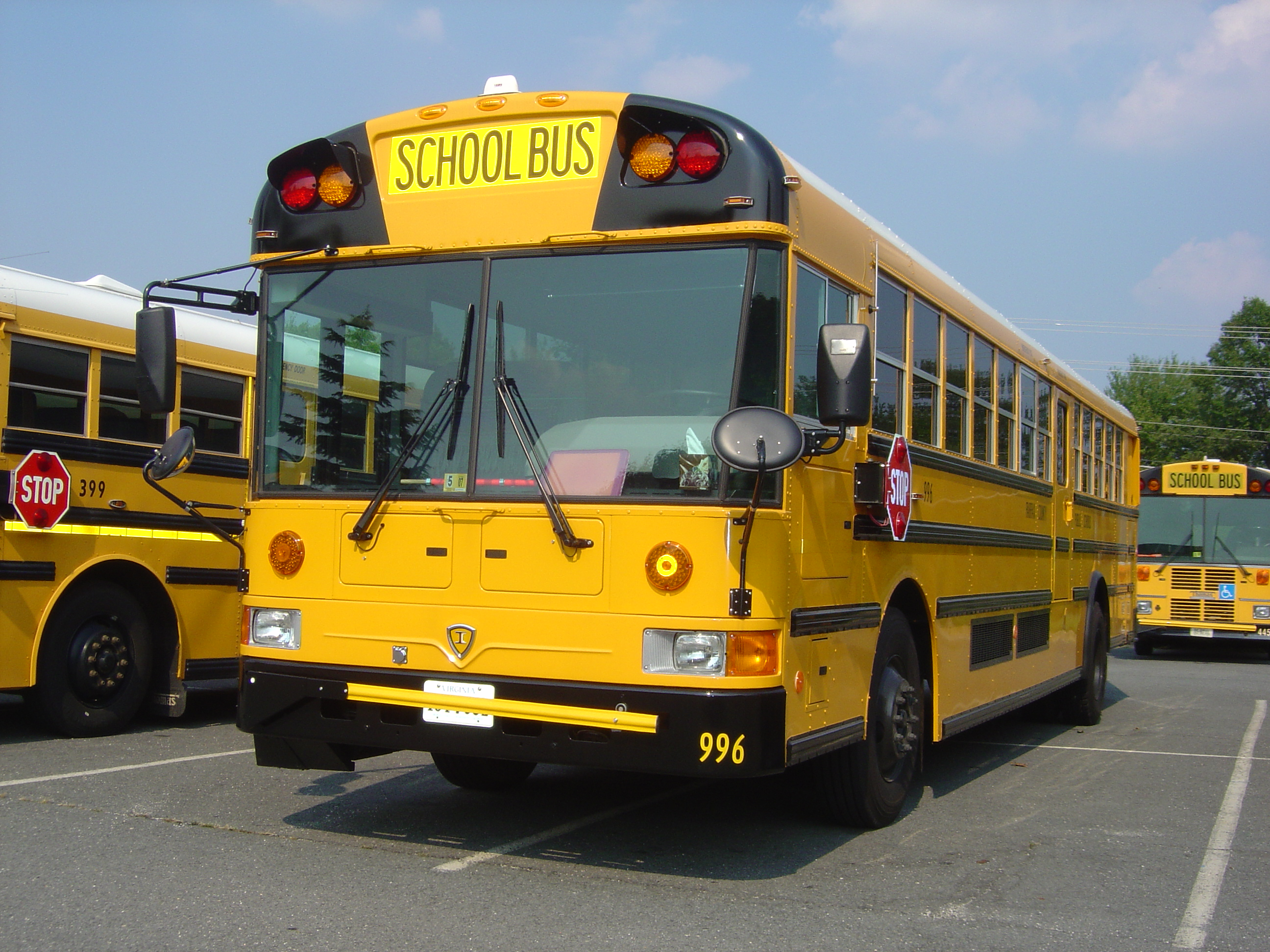

Overview
- Manufacturer: IC Bus (Navistar)
- Production: 1996–2024
- Assembly: United States: Conway, Arkansas (Conway Bus Plant) (1996–2008?); Tulsa, Oklahoma (Tulsa Bus Plant) (2008?–2024)

Body and chassis
- Class: Type D (transit-style)
- Body style: Body-on-chassis: School bus; Commercial bus
- Chassis: International 3000
- Related: 3000

Powertrain
- Engine: Navistar DT 466 210–285 hp (1996–2007); Navistar MaxxForce DT 210–285 hp (2007–2010, 2013–2017); Navistar MaxxForce DT 215–285 hp (2010–2013); Cummins L9 200–260 hp (2017–2024)
- Capacity: 66–84
- Transmission: Allison PTS 2500 5-speed automatic (standard)

Dimensions
- Length: 33'2" – 42'2"
- Width: 96 in (2,438 mm)
- Curb weight: 31,800–37,000 lb (14,424–16,783 kg) (GVWR)

Chronology
- Predecessor: Ward RE (until c. 1975)

The IC Bus RE Series, also known as the IC RE, is a school bus that is manufactured by IC Corporation, a subsidiary of Navistar International. Originally introduced in 1996 as the AmTran RE, it is primarily used in school bus applications, as well as some commercial applications. IC Bus manufactured the RE in Tulsa, Oklahoma from 2008 to 2024. Originally, the RE was also manufactured in Conway, Arkansas; this facility is now closed.

== Design history ==
For the 1997 model year, AmTran introduced its first all-new full-size bus, the AmTran RE. The first rear-engine bus produced by AmTran or Ward in over 20 years, the RE broke from industry precedent in not sharing a common body design with the front-engine Genesis.

For the 2001 model year, the RE began to use the "International" branding like the IC. In 2002, for the 2003 model year, the company was renamed "IC Corporation" and the model was renamed "IC RE".

As Navistar abandoned its use of MaxxForce engines (due to the use of EGR emissions treatment systems), the company announced that the MaxxForce DT was replaced by the Cummins L9 for 2017 production.

In 2018, IC Bus introduced Full View Camera Technology by Rosco. The camera system, in conjunction with mirrors, gave drivers a “full view” around the bus. The same year, IC Bus introduced other safety features on their buses' electronic stability control (ESC) and collision mitigation technology. These two feature helped drivers better maintain control and avoid collisions. In 2021, IC Bus announced it will discontinue the RE Series after the 2024 model year, and since then, it has been discontinued.

== Model specifications ==
Model name	RE 200 (discontinued)	RE 300 (discontinued)
Seating capacity	66–84	
Overall length (inches)	33'2" to 42'2"	
Body width (exterior)	96 inches (2.4 m)	
Fuel type(s)	Diesel	
Engine	Navistar T444E (1996–2003); Navistar VT 365 (2003–2007)	Navistar DT 466E (1996–2007) (210–285 hp or 157–213 kW); Navistar DT 530E (1996–2002); Navistar MaxxForce DT (210–285 hp or 157–213 kW, 2007–2010, 2013–2017) (215–285 hp or 160–213 kW, 2010–2013); Cummins L9 (2017–2024) (200–260 hp or 150–190 kW)
Transmission	Allison PTS 2500 5-speed automatic (standard); Allison PTS 3000 6-speed automatic	
