= Palmetto Assessment of State Standards =

The Palmetto Assessment of State Standards is a United States standards-aligned test designed to meet No Child Left Behind (NCLB) requirements taken by students in the state of South Carolina. It is administered in grades 3–8 in writing, language arts, mathematics, science, and social studies.

The Palmetto Assessment of State Standards reports out Lexile measures for every student. A Lexile measure can be used to match readers with targeted text and monitor growth in reading ability.
