= Wisconsin Knowledge and Concepts Examination =

Phased out proficiency examination introduced during Bush presidency

The Wisconsin Knowledge and Concepts Examination, usually referred to as the WKCE's, was a proficiency examination designed to meet the requirements of the federal No Child Left Behind legislation. It was administered in grades 3-8 and 10 in the subjects of reading, mathematics, science, language arts, and social studies. Beginning in the 2002-2003 school year, test scores helped determine whether students could advance from 4th to 5th grade and from 8th to 9th grade. In 2013, Wisconsin raised the scores needed to be assessed "proficient" or "advanced". This change was made to make the test consistent with standards set by the National Assessment of Educational Progress and as a condition for Wisconsin to receive a waiver from the No Child Left Behind Act.

In 2014–2015, the final year in which the test was employed, testing was limited to science and social studies.

== See also ==
- Wisconsin Department of Public Instruction
