= Exit examination =

High school leaving examination

Educational stages in the United States

An exit examination is a test that students must pass to receive a diploma and graduate from school. Such examinations have been used in a variety of countries; this article focuses on their use within the United States. These are usually criterion-referenced tests which were implemented as part of a comprehensive standards-based education reform program which sets into place new standards intended to increase the learning of all students.

When any test is directly tied to significant consequences, such as determining whether the student may receive a high school diploma, it is called a high-stakes test. Many organizations such as the National Council of Teachers of Mathematics (NCTM) oppose high-stakes tests in general, with the NCTM saying that "placing too much emphasis on a single test or on testing can undermine the quality of education and jeopardize equality of opportunity." At the same time, almost all states that hold an exit exam for graduation allow students to take the test multiple times and further allow routes to graduation for students that fail.

In 2011, 24 states required passing a high school exit examination for graduation, and three additional states had legislation instituting such exams in the future.

== History ==
Graduation examinations first appeared in the U.S. after the Civil War, when the Regents Board of the State of New York imposed its first exams, outlining a model that a new educational performance standard should be set for all students, to be met by 16. Students passing a series of performance-based assessments that incorporate the standard would be awarded a Certificate of Initial Mastery. This certificate would qualify the student to choose among going to work, entering a college preparatory program, or studying for a Technical and Professional Certificate, which would be explicitly tied to advanced job requirements. These standards would not be intended as sorting mechanisms, but would allow multiple opportunities for success; the goal would simply be to ensure achievement of high performance standards for the great majority of the nation's workforce. The states would ensure that virtually all students achieve the Certificate of Initial Mastery. Most of the current high school examinations are also given for the first time in the 10th grade even if US students are usually not expected to have completed high school until grade 12.

In the United States comprehensive high school model, all students are expected to complete 12 years of public education, with some students taking primarily vocational based courses, while college-bound students taking primarily academic courses, but education reform seeks to graduate all students with some work experience and enough academic skills to succeed in college.

== Use ==
In states that require students to pass a high school graduation test, the students are typically given multiple opportunities to take the test each year, over several years. For example, in the State of California, students could take the California High School Exit Exam up to eight times over three years until the exam was abolished in 2018.

== Controversy about exit exams ==
Over time, there has been debate about the use of exit exams. Opponents of the use of test-based accountability, as typified by the report of the National Research Council on the subject, argue that the exams lead to more high school dropouts without increasing student performance. Others including Eric Hanushek have argued that scientific evidence on this is lacking and that the use of these examinations is consistent with the standards movement for educational reform.

== Alternatives ==
Students who are unable to pass the exit examinations given by their local public school may be able to use an alternative assessment to demonstrate mastery of the material.

They may also be able to graduate from a private school or a school in another state by transferring their accumulated credits at the end of the last year of school.

In India, The Board Exam or Board Examination is a public Exit Examination conducted at end of Grade 10 (class 10) which is called All India Secondary School Examination is for the completion of Secondary School and for Class 12 (Grade 12) which is called the All India Senior Secondary Certificate Examination. It is one of the largest Exit Examinations in the world; in 2024 around 4 Million students registered and appeared all across India and in 26 countries including The Middle east countries, Singapore and in the US.

== See also ==
- List of standardized tests in the United States
- List of state graduation exams in the United States
