= Georgia Educational Technology Fair =

Annual US student technology competition

The Georgia Educational Technology Fair (GaETF) is an annual student technology competition produced by the Georgia Educational Technology Consortium. The Consortium sponsors other technology initiatives in Georgia, including the Georgia Educational Technology Conference (GaETC). The GaETF is the highest level of student technology competition in Georgia and approximately 400 projects, representing the work of 450 students, are judged at the competition each Spring.

== Competition ==
Finalists who receive first place at recognized regional technology fairs may compete at state.

Competition is open to all third through twelfth grade students residing in the state.

There are fourteen categories in the competition: Case Modification, Digital Video Production, Hardware, Individual and Team Programming Challenge, Web 2.0 Internet Applications, Multimedia Applications, Non-multimedia Applications, Project Programming, Robotics, Technology Literacy Challenge, Animated Graphic Design, Non-Animated Graphic Design, Digital Photography and 3D Modeling.

== History ==
Lou Dewberry started the Georgia Educational Technology Fair in 2001. With Lou Dewberry's passing in 2007, the Fair created the Lou Dewberry Memorial Scholarship. The scholarship is awarded annually to a participating high school senior at the state competition.

The Georgia Educational Technology Fair has been held across the state every year since 2001.

The 2015 Technology Fair was held in Macon, Georgia..

2020–2021 saw this fair go virtual.

== Leadership ==
The Georgia Educational Technology Fair is directed by Tom Lamb and Anthony Shields. The following individuals make up the rest of the steering committee that coordinate the annual event: Jim Hardin, Reesa Azar, Vicki Boatwright, Mike Evans, Richard Free, and Kathy Politis.

The Georgia Educational Technology Consortium which produces the technology competition, is a nonprofit organization independent of any educational or commercial entities and is governed by a 15-member Board of Directors, under the leadership of Dr. Wayne Robinson.
