= Arizona's Instrument to Measure Standards =

Former high school graduation test

Arizona's Instrument to Measure Standards (AIMS) was a standardized test administered by the state of Arizona. AIMS was a standards-based assessment aligned with the Arizona Academic Content Standards. In November 2014, the Arizona State Board of Education voted to replace AIMS with a new test called AzMERIT (Arizona's Measurement of Educational Readiness to Inform Teaching).

== Test contents ==
The content of AIMS varied by grade level, but it usually featured three reading and mathematics sections, as well as a writing portion, where students were assigned to write an essay based on a prompt given to them. For some grade levels, the test included a science portion in lieu of a writing section.

== High School Graduation ==
To graduate from an Arizona public high school, a student had to meet the AIMS High School Graduation Requirement. The most common way to meet this requirement was to pass the writing, reading, and mathematics content areas of the AIMS HS test. High school students had multiple opportunities to take and pass these content areas. For students who did not pass all three required content areas of the AIMS HS test, there were alternative methods for meeting the AIMS High School Graduation requirement. This requirement was dropped after the test was replaced by the AzMERIT test.

== AIMS scholarships ==
Additionally, starting with the class of 2006, high-school students in Arizona who exceeded all three standards in reading, writing, and math may have been eligible for a scholarship to any of the three public state universities if they also met certain other criteria. Students must have completed all 16 core competency courses (4 units English, 4 units Math, 3 units Lab Science, 2 units Social Science, 2 units Foreign Language, and 1 unit Fine Arts) by graduation with a B or better in each course. Students must have also met at least one of the following academic requirements: A cumulative GPA of 3.5 or higher on an unweighted 4.0 scale, or rank in the top 5% of their graduating class.

If a student did not exceed standards on all three tests, they may have still qualified for a scholarship if they exceeded standards on two of the AIMS sections and met standards on the other section. Additionally, they would have either needed to receive at least a score of 3 on two Advanced Placement tests or at least a score of 4 on two International Baccalaureate exams.

Qualified students would receive a full state university tuition waiver valid for one year following graduation from high school. The scholarship was renewable for four years based upon university-determined criteria. The actual dollar amount of the scholarship varied based upon the tuition charged by the state university in which they enrolled.

On September 23, 2010, the Arizona Board of Regents voted 9-1 to cut AIMS scholarships to just 25% of freshman year tuition, stating that the scholarship was too easy to earn. Students also had to have an ACT score of at least 28 or an SAT-1 score of at least 1300 (i.e. the reading and mathematics scores must have been at least 1300). The changes in AIMS scholarships applied beginning with the graduating class of 2013.

== Additional facts ==
In 2007, the AIMS Test began to report out Lexile measures for students in grades 3-8 and 10. A Lexile measure can be used to match readers with targeted text and monitor growth in reading ability.
