= Missouri Assessment Program =

U.S. state annual standardized tests

The Missouri Assessment Program (MAP) is an annual set of mandatory standardized tests taken by students in the U.S. state of Missouri.

== State Content Assessments ==
Grade-Level Assessment - Students in grades 3-8 are tested in English Language Arts and math. Students in grades 5 and 8 are also tested in Science.

End-of-Course Assessment - Students are required to take Algebra I, English II, Biology and Government prior to graduation. Districts may also administer Algebra II, American History, English I, Geometry, Personal Finance and Physical Science assessments.

== State Content Alternate Assessments ==
MAP-A - There is also the MAP-Alternate (MAP-A) designed for students with severe cognitive disabilities who meet grade level and eligibility criteria. Communication arts is assessed at grades 3-8 and 11, math is assessed at grades 3-8 and 10 and science is assessed at grades 5, 8 and 11. Missouri does not have a 2% modified assessment.

== State ELP Assessment ==
WIDA ACCESS - In 2010, Missouri became the 23rd state to join the WIDA Consortium. Missouri uses the WIDA ACCESS assessment as its English Language Proficiency assessment. Missouri requires all incoming possible English learners students to use the WIDA Screener.
