= Georgia High School Graduation Test =

Standardized test in Georgia, United States

The Georgia High School Graduation Test, or GHSGT, was administered to all students in the eleventh grade in the US state of Georgia from 1991 to 2013. It determined whether or not a student was eligible to graduate from a Georgia high school.

The test consisted of five subject areas:

1. English/Language Arts
2. Mathematics
3. Science
4. Social Studies
5. Writing

Students were required to pass all five tests to graduate from high school. They were allowed to retake a test as many times as needed, until they achieved a passing score.

Students took the graduation tests for the first time in the eleventh grade, if they wished to graduate early. The Writing Assessment took place in the fall, and the GHSGT in English Language Arts, Mathematics, Science, and Social Studies occurred in the spring of the eleventh grade.

Each test was scored from 100 to 300, with 300 being a perfect score, and students needed at least 200 points in order to pass each exam. A score higher than 235 resulted in graduation "with honors."

Teachers reviewed the testing process with the students before they administered the test, and there were resources available to prepare both students and teachers for the actual taking of the test.

Additionally, the GHSGT reported a Lexile measure for each student, which was used to match readers with targeted texts and monitor growth in reading ability.
