= Oklahoma Core Curriculum Tests =

The Oklahoma Core Curriculum Tests are standards-aligned tests designed to meet NCLB requirements. The following tests are administered:

Grade	Subjects
3rd Grade	Math and Reading
4th Grade	Math and Reading
5th Grade	Math, Reading, Science, Social Studies, and Writing
6th Grade	Math and Reading
7th Grade	Math, Reading, and Geography
8th Grade	Math, Reading, Science, Writing and US History
"EOI" (End of Instruction)	Algebra I, Algebra II, Geometry, English II, English III, Biology I, and US History

Additionally, the Oklahoma Core Curriculum Tests report out Lexile measures for students in grades 3–8. A Lexile measure can be used to match readers with targeted text and monitor growth in reading ability.
