= Tennessee Comprehensive Assessment Program =

Standardized testing for the state of Tennessee

The Tennessee Comprehensive Assessment Program (TCAP) is the statewide standardized testing program in Tennessee, designed to evaluate student proficiency in core academic subjects. Administered by the Tennessee Department of Education, TCAP assessments are given to students in grades 3–8 in English Language Arts, mathematics, science, and social studies (grades 6+), while high school students take End-of-Course (EOC) exams in subjects such as algebra, geometry, English, biology, and U.S. history. The program aligns with the state’s academic standards and plays a role in measuring student achievement, school performance, and educator effectiveness.

== Program history ==
Tennessee has used TCAP tests since 1989–90. In 2010, a linking study was performed so that the TCAP could report out Lexile measures for students in grades 3-8 and 10. A Lexile measure can be used to match readers with targeted text and monitor growth in reading ability. This Test was discontinued in the 2015–2016 school year because a private company developed the TNReady tests. TNReady was unsuccessful during the first school year because the company failed to provide testing materials to all students who were supposed to take the test, and testing in the 2015–2016 school year for Tennessee was canceled due to this. In the following school year, the state still used TNReady, but in paper form instead of electronic. The TNReady test was administered to all subjects above, except for science, which continued to be TNReady until the 2018–2019 school year.

Soon after this unsuccessful attempt, TNReady tried again with electronic testing during the 2017–2018 school year. Contrary to the previous time, the system didn't discontinue; however, there was much lagging and several times where a student couldn't submit a test, delaying testing a week and a half past the previous end time.

== Test structure ==
The paper test is administered with two different tests, given out to every other student so as to prevent cheating. Each test has multiple subparts. Language Arts has four subparts. The first is an essay based test, which is randomly selected to be either narrative, explanatory, or argumentative. The time allowed on this is 85 minutes. The second and third subparts are reading and vocabulary comprehension. The fourth subpart is grammar and mechanics, based similar to the SAT's style of this.

Extra time can be allowed for children with specialized education plans, also including 504 and IEP students. The test times are extended, for most cases, the regular test time + 50%. In recent years, students taking a normally educated test have been allowed extra time from up to 20% of the recommended time. For example, in the first Language Arts subpart, students are now allowed 102 minutes max on the test compared to the 85 minutes prior to this update.
