= Alabama High School Graduation Exam =

Former Alabama standardized exam

The Alabama High School Graduation Exam (AHSGE) was a test to assess mastery of content standards, introduced during the No Child Left Behind education reform effort and discontinued in 2013. It was administered in grades 10-12. Students were not allowed to receive a diploma until they had passed all sections of the exam.
