= Criterion-Referenced Competency Tests =

Set of Georgia public school tests

The Criterion-Referenced Competency Tests (CRCT) were a set of tests administered at public schools in the state of Georgia that was designed to test the knowledge of first through eighth graders in reading, English/language arts (ELA), and mathematics, and third through eighth graders additionally in science and social studies.

Georgia law, as amended by the A+ Education Reform Act of 2000, required that all students from first to eighth grade take the CRCT in the content areas of reading, English/language arts, and mathematics. Students in third through eighth grade were also assessed in science and social studies. The CRCT only assessed the content standards outlined in the Common Core Georgia Performance Standards, which was the curriculum that Georgia teachers were required to teach.

The CRCT was implemented in spring 2000. That year, summative, end-of-year assessments in reading, English/language arts, and mathematics were administered in fourth, sixth, and eighth grades. Assessments in science and social studies (third through eighth grades) were administered for the first time in spring 2002. Additionally, assessments in reading, English/language arts, and mathematics were administered in first, second, third, fifth, and seventh grades in spring 2002.

Students in third, fifth, and eighth grades were required to pass the CRCT to be promoted to the next grade.

The state also included Lexile measures with scores for students in grades 3-8. A Lexile measure can be used to match readers with targeted text and monitor growth in reading ability.

The CRCT was last used in the 2013-2014 school year. It was replaced by the Georgia Milestones Assessment System, which contains thought-provoking questions, norm-referenced items, online administration, and a writing component.

== Scoring ==
Students received a report during the summer that tells them their scale score and their accuracy for all of the sections assessed on the CRCT. The scale score was used to determine if the student exceeds, meets, or does not meet state standards. If the student scores above an 850, he/she is considered to be exceeding the standards in that subject area. If the student's scale score is between 800-849 (inclusive), he/she is considered to be meeting the standards in that subject area. The state considers scores below 800 as not meeting standards. Students could have also determine their accuracy on any part of the test because their score reports show the number of questions they got right and the number of total questions that were administered. The highest score varies between subjects, but ranges from 850 to 980.

== Controversy ==
In July 2011, an investigation uncovered that 178 teachers from the Atlanta area had been found to be cheating from as early as 2001 by falsifying test results. Aside from the teachers, 38 principals were linked to the scandal either by directly participating in the changing of wrong answers or allowing the changes to be made when they knew, or had the responsibility to know, what was going on.
