= Indiana Statewide Testing for Educational Progress-Plus =

Indiana Statewide Testing for Educational Progress-Plus (usually referred to simply as ISTEP or ISTEP+) was an annual No Child Left Behind test designed by the Indiana Department of Education to measure students' mastery of basic skills, particularly reading, writing, and mathematics. Before 2009 it was administered in the fall; beginning the 2009–10 school year it was administered in the spring. All students in grades 3 through 8 and high school sophomores took the ISTEP+ each spring, with language arts and math covered in each test. Additionally, students in grades 4 and 6 were tested in science and 5 and 7 on social studies. The test consisted of two components: a written test (usually in March) and a Multiple-choice test over the same subjects (April). It was replaced by iLearn in 2019.

== Graduation Qualifying Exam ==
Successfully completing the final (grade 10) ISTEP Graduation Qualifying Exam (GQE) was not necessary to graduate from an Indiana public high school. This test covered English/Language Arts and Mathematics. If a student did not pass this test, he or she was placed in remediation classes the following semester for the subject(s) that he or she failed and remained in those classes until the semester after passing both sections. Students could retake the exam during their junior and senior year of high school.

Beginning in the 2009–2010 school year the GQE was replaced by two End of Course Assessments (commonly known as ECAs), one for Algebra I and one for English 10, which functionally served the same purpose and, like the GQE, could be retaken twice a year until students pass or reach the end of their senior years. During the 2012–2013 school year an ECA for Biology was added as a requirement for incoming freshmen.

== Testing Date ==
Beginning with the 1999–2001 school year the test was moved from fall to spring. During the 1999–2001 school year the test was given both in its old fall time slot and its new spring location in the calendar. In subsequent years the test was given in the spring. In the 2011 Spring ISTEP+, students in the 5th and 8th grades took their multiple choice ISTEP's on the computer via McGraw-Hill. Some controversy had arisen after computer glitches in 2011 and again in April 2013.

== Discontinuation ==
On March 22, 2016, Mike Pence, then governor of Indiana, signed the House Enrolled Act 1395 at Eagle Elementary School in Zionsville, Indiana, which has the effect of eliminating ISTEP by July 1, 2017. The bill will also give way for a 23-member panel to study and formulate an alternative No Child Left Behind test to ISTEP.
