= Minnesota Comprehensive Assessments—Series II =

Standardized tests in Minnesota

The Minnesota Comprehensive Assessments—Series II (MCA–II) are the state tests measuring student progress for districts to meet the No Child Left Behind requirements. Mathematics are tested in grades 3–8 and 11. Reading is assessed in grades 3–8, writing in grade 9, and natural science is given in grades 5 and 8.

Students take one test in each academic subject. Most students take the MCA, but students who receive special education services and meet eligibility criteria may take the MCA-Modified or the MTAS.
