= End of Course Test =

Academic assessment

The End of Course Test (EOCT, EOC, or EOC Test) is an academic assessment conducted in many states by the State Board of Education and Island of Bermuda. Georgia, for example, tests from the ninth to twelfth grades, and North Carolina tests for any of the four core class subjects (math, science, social studies, and English).

North Carolina schools administer an EOCT in English II, Math I (Algebra I), Biology and Math 3 (Integrated Mathematics). The official purpose of the test is to assess both individual and group knowledge and skills. EOCTs are mandatory and require a minimum score for graduation eligibility. Additionally, a North Carolina student's EOCT score must account for at least 25% of the student's final grade in the relevant course.

Georgia high schools are required to administer a standardized, multiple-choice EOCT, in each of eight core subjects including Algebra I, U.S. History, Biology, Physical Science (8th-grade only—students in 11th grade do not take the EOC anymore), and American Literature and Composition. The official purpose of the tests is to assess "specific content knowledge and skills." Although a minimum test score is not required for the student to receive credit in the course or to graduate from high school, completion of the test is mandatory. The EOCT score comprises 20% of a student's grade in the course. Since the EOCT is an official, state-administered test, any violation or interference can result in the invalidation of scores of all students taking the exam on that subject. Interferences can include cellphones, mp3 players, reading books on the same subject as the exam, and talking.

Also, E.O.C. tests can be taken in middle schools. For example, in the state of Florida, it is mandatory for 7th graders (middle school) to take a Civics E.O.C. Test. A student can pass only if they attain a level of 3, 4 or 5.

Florida public schools administrate End of Course Examination for Grade 7 Civics, Algebra 1, Geometry, Biology 1, and US History. For all high school EOC courses, EOC are worth 30% of student's final grade and passing score are required in order to receive full credit (1). In addition, Students must pass Algebra 1 EOC and Grade 10 FAST ELA Progress Monitor #3 in order to receive high school diploma. For Civics EOC, student's exam score won't factor into their final grade but a score of 3 or higher is required in order to promote to high school.

The Four Subjects End of Course Assessment is administer and mandatory in the British Overseas Territory of Bermuda. Language Art, Math, Science, and Social Study EOC are usually taken in 10th-11th Grade Year and covered 3 years of the subject materials (For example, Grade 9-11 science context are tested in the Science EOC). Scores are ranged from 0%-100% with about 2.25% curve. Students must score at least 73.50% with curve on each EOC Assessment in order to receive secondary diploma.

== South Carolina EOCEP ==
In the state of South Carolina, EOC's are usually worth 20% of the student's final grade. Students EOCEP scores should be released within 24 hours after the testing window. Students are NOT able to opt out of the test. EOC's are state mandated as well as it is a requirement for passing the specific course. Students should review the year's worth of lessons and prepare themselves for the 40-60 item test. (Some test can be shorter/longer, depending on the state)
