= Education in Vietnam =

Ministry of Education and Training

National education budget (2022)
- Budget: Est. 2.9% of GDP

General details
- Primary languages: Vietnamese
- System type: Public, private

Literacy (2024)
- Total: 96%
- Male: 97%
- Female: 95%
- Primary: 8.9 million
- Secondary: 9.54 million
- Post secondary: 2.19 million

Attainment (2014)
- Secondary diploma: 94%
- Post-secondary diploma: 441,800

Education in Vietnam is a state-run system of public and private education run by the Ministry of Education and Training. It is divided into five levels: preschool, primary school, secondary school, high school, and higher education. Formal education consists of twelve years of basic education, including five years of primary education, four years of secondary education, and three years of high school education. The majority of basic education students are enrolled on a daily basis. The main goals are general knowledge improvement, human resource training, and talent development.

Historically, education in Vietnam followed the Chinese Confucian model, using Chữ Hán (for the Vietnamese language and for Chinese) as the main mode of literature and governance. This system promoted those who were talented enough to be mandarins or royal courtiers in Vietnam and China. This system was then completely overhauled and replaced by a French model system during French colonial times, which has since been replaced and overhauled again during the formation of independent Vietnam and the creation of Chữ Quốc Ngữ alphabet in the 1920s.

Vietnam has attempted to expand its education system. In 2012, estimated national budget for education was 6.3%. In the decade prior, Vietnamese public reception of the country's education system has concerns regarding its inflexible nature and its tests. Citizens have been critical of the curriculum, which has led to social issues including depression, anxiety, and increasing suicide rates. There have been comments from the public that schools should opt for a more flexible studying program, with less emphasis on tests and more focus on developing life skills. In response to public opinion, the Ministry of Education and Training implemented a number of education reforms. Tertiary enrollment rates were 3% in 1995 and then increased to around 30% by 2019.

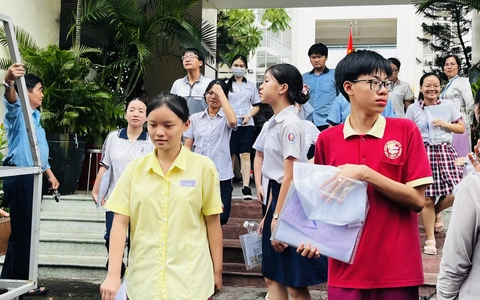
Student in Vietnam

== Establishments ==
Regarding ownership, as prescribed in Article 44 of Vietnam's Education Law, there are four types of educational establishments:

- Public education establishments: established and monitored by the State. The State also nominates their administrators and decides staff quota. The State invests in infrastructure and allocates funding for their regular spending tasks.
- Semi-public educational establishments: set up by the State on the basis of mobilizing organizations and individuals in the society to jointly invest in infrastructure.
- People-founded educational establishments: Social or economic organizations apply for permission from the State to set up an institution with non-State budget capital.
- Private educational establishments: Individuals or groups of individuals apply for permission from the State to set up and invest in the institution by themselves.

The semi-public, people-founded and private educational establishments are referred collectively to as non-public educational establishments.

== School grades ==
In Vietnam, a school year is divided into two semesters. For the 2025-2026 school year, the term dates are from 5 September to 18 January or earlier. Schools can start the school year up to one week early for grade 2-8 and grade 10-11, up to two weeks early for grade 1, 9 and 12. The second term begin from mid-January (specific date based on each school) to 31 May or earlier.

Level/Grade	Typical age
Preschool
Pre-school playgroup	3-4
Kindergarten	4-5
Primary school
First grade	6-7
Second grade	7-8
Third grade	8-9
Fourth grade	9-10
Fifth grade	10-11
Middle school (Junior high school)
Sixth grade	11-12
Seventh grade	12-13
Eighth grade	13-14
Ninth grade	14-15
High school
Tenth grade	15-16
Eleventh grade	16-17
Twelfth grade	17-18
Post-secondary education (Higher education)
Junior college (Note: In Vietnam, tertiary education is divided into two types: university education (giáo dục đại học)–which offers research-orientated programs and lasts for four years, and college education (giáo dục cao đẳng)–which offers vocational programs and lasts for two or three years.)	Ages vary (2–3 years)
University	Ages vary (usually 4 years)
Postgraduate education
Master	Ages vary (usually 2 years)
Ph.D.	Ages vary (usually 4 years)

== Academic grading ==
The Vietnamese grading system is an academic grading system utilized in Vietnam. It is based on a 0 to 10-point scale, similar to the US 1.0-4.0 scale. Typically when an American educational institution requests a grade-point average (GPA) calculated on the 4 point scale, the student will be expected to do a direct mathematical conversion, so 10 becomes 4.0, 7.5 becomes 3.0, etc.

The practice of most Vietnamese colleges is not to provide official transcripts to other universities on behalf of their students. Students can request a signed and stamped original transcript from their school, and then have copies certified with a red stamp at a government office. Translation services are also available at such offices.

== Primary ==
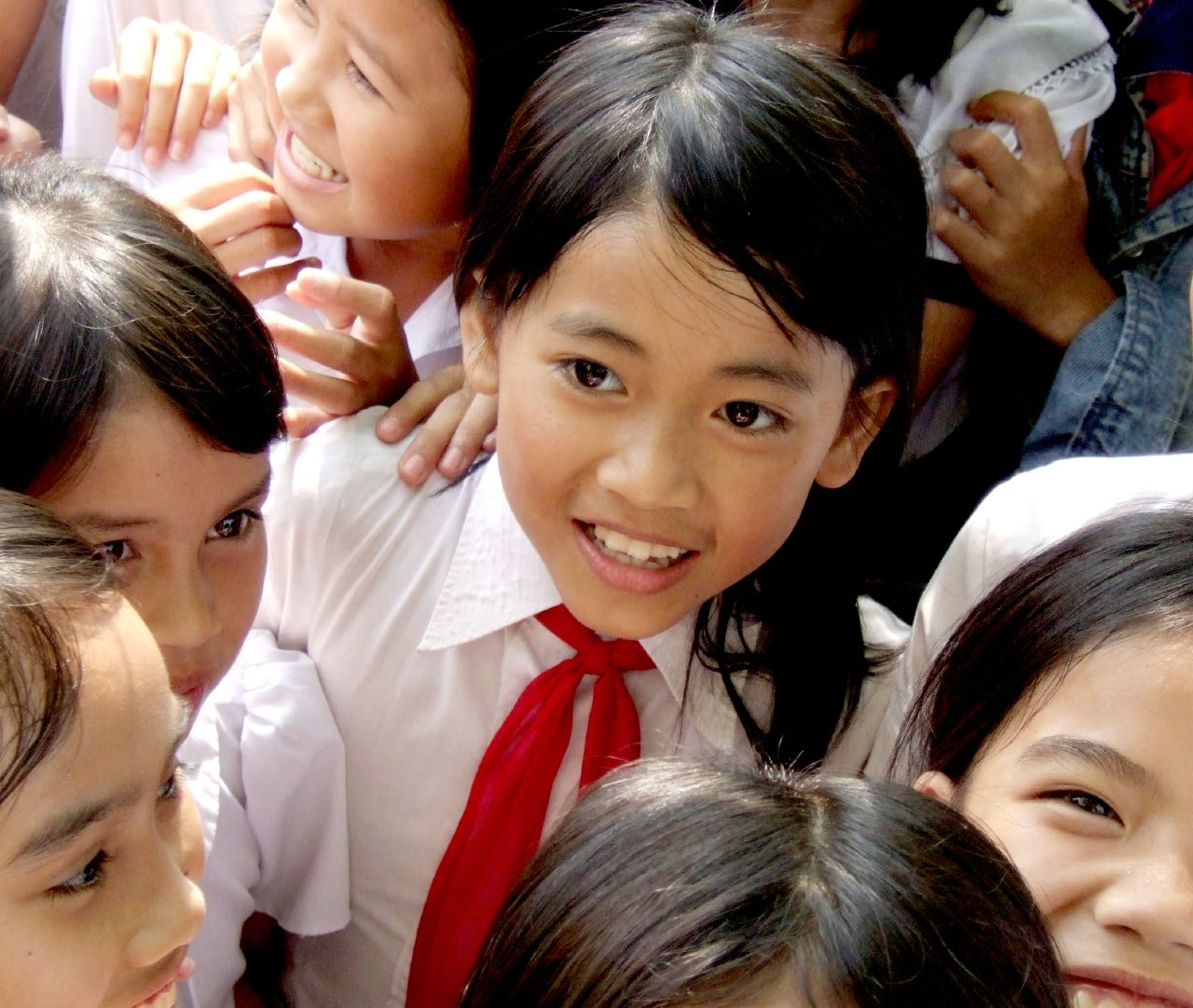
Primary students in Da Nang, Vietnam

Children normally start primary education (tiểu học) at the age of six. Education at this level lasts for 5 years and is compulsory for all children. The country's literacy rate is over 90%.

According to the Multiple Indicators Cluster Survey 2006 of Vietnam's General Statistics Office, 96% of six to 11-year-old children enrolled in primary school. There was still a disparity in the primary education completion rate among different ethnicity groups. While primary completion rate for Kinh students was 86%, the rate for ethnic minority children was 61%.

In the school year 2009–2010, Vietnam had 15,172 primary schools and 611 combined primary and lower secondary schools. The total enrollment was 7.02 million pupils, of whom 46% were girls.

The renovated primary education curriculum in Vietnam is divided into two phases as follows:

- Phase 1 includes Grades 1, 2 and 3 with 9 subjects: Vietnamese Language, Mathematics, Morality, Nature and Society, Arts, Physical Education, and (since 2020) Experience Activities, Information Technology and Foreign Language.
- Phase 2 includes Grades 4 and 5 with 12 subjects: Vietnamese Language, Information Technology, Mathematics, Morality, Science (Nature and Society), History, Geography, Basic Techniques, Music, Arts, Physical Education and (since 2023) Experience Activities and Foreign Language.

== Secondary ==
Secondary education (trung học) consists of lower secondary education or junior high school (trung học cơ sở) followed by high school or upper secondary high school (trung học phổ thông).

=== Middle school ===
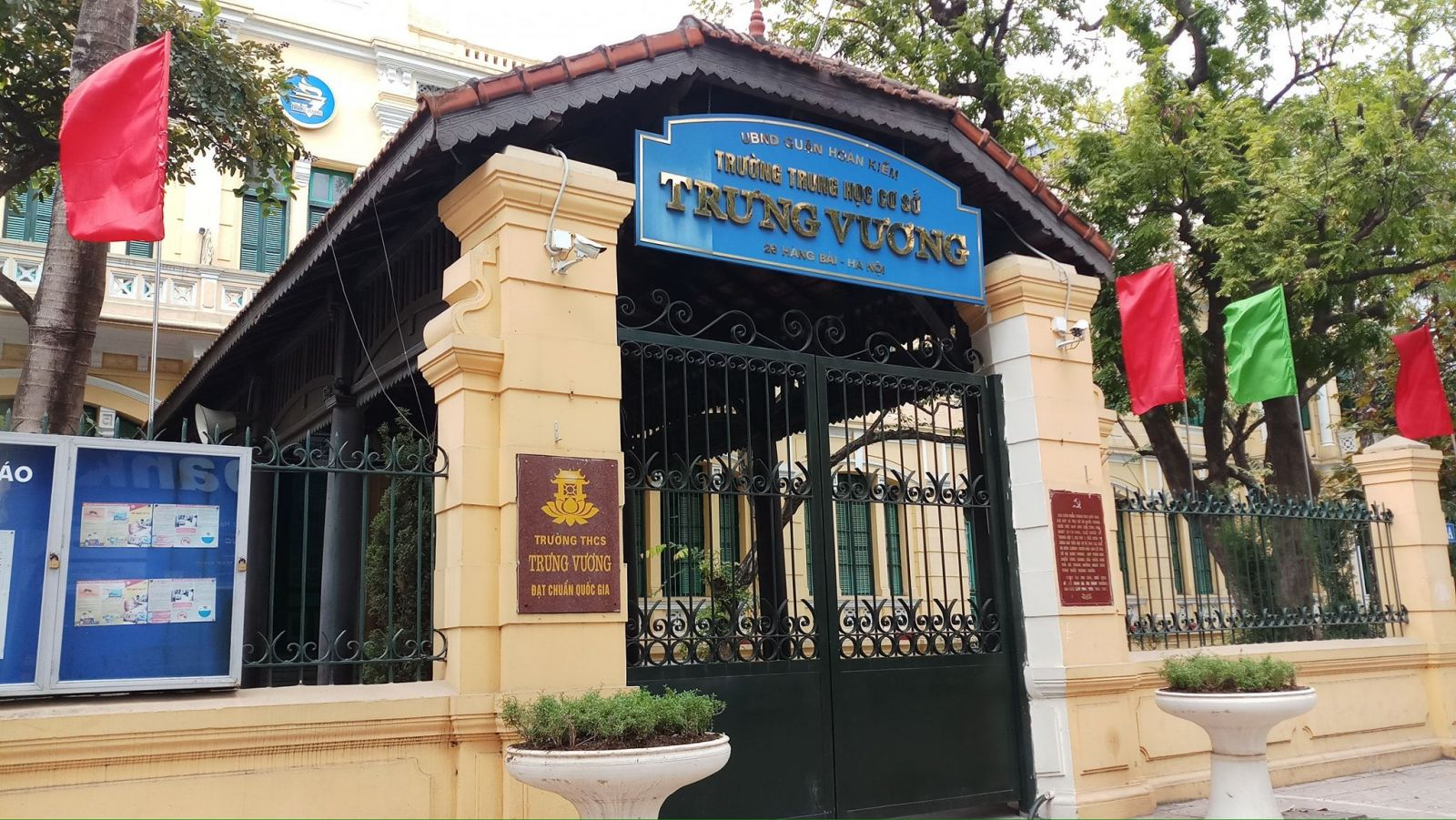
Trưng Vương Lower Secondary School

Lower secondary school (Vietnamese: trung học cơ sở) or Junior high school includes sixth, seventh, eighth and ninth grade. The Intermediate Graduation Examination (IGE)—presented by the local Department of Education and Training—was abolished in 2006.

Schools typically set out their own admission process for entrance to middle schools. Most require an entrance test, a review of the student's grade in primary school, or both.

The Lower Secondary Education's weekly schedule includes the following subjects and activities: Vietnamese Language (Literature), Mathematics, Natural Science (Biology, Physics, Chemistry), History and Geography, Civics, Foreign Language, Physical Education, Technology, Art, Music, Optional Subjects, Class Activities and School Activities, Vocational-oriented activities (3 periods per month in Grade 8 or in some cases, the summer between 7th and 8th Grade) and Extra-curricular activities (4 periods per month in all grades). Ιn the end of year 8, student will participate in secondary vocational exam to earn extra-mark for the 10th grade examination.

The Technology subject aims to show the link between theory and practice. It includes four parts: home economics (in Grade 6), agriculture-forestry and aquaculture (in Grade 7), Industry (in Grade 8) and optional modules (in Grade 9).

=== High school ===
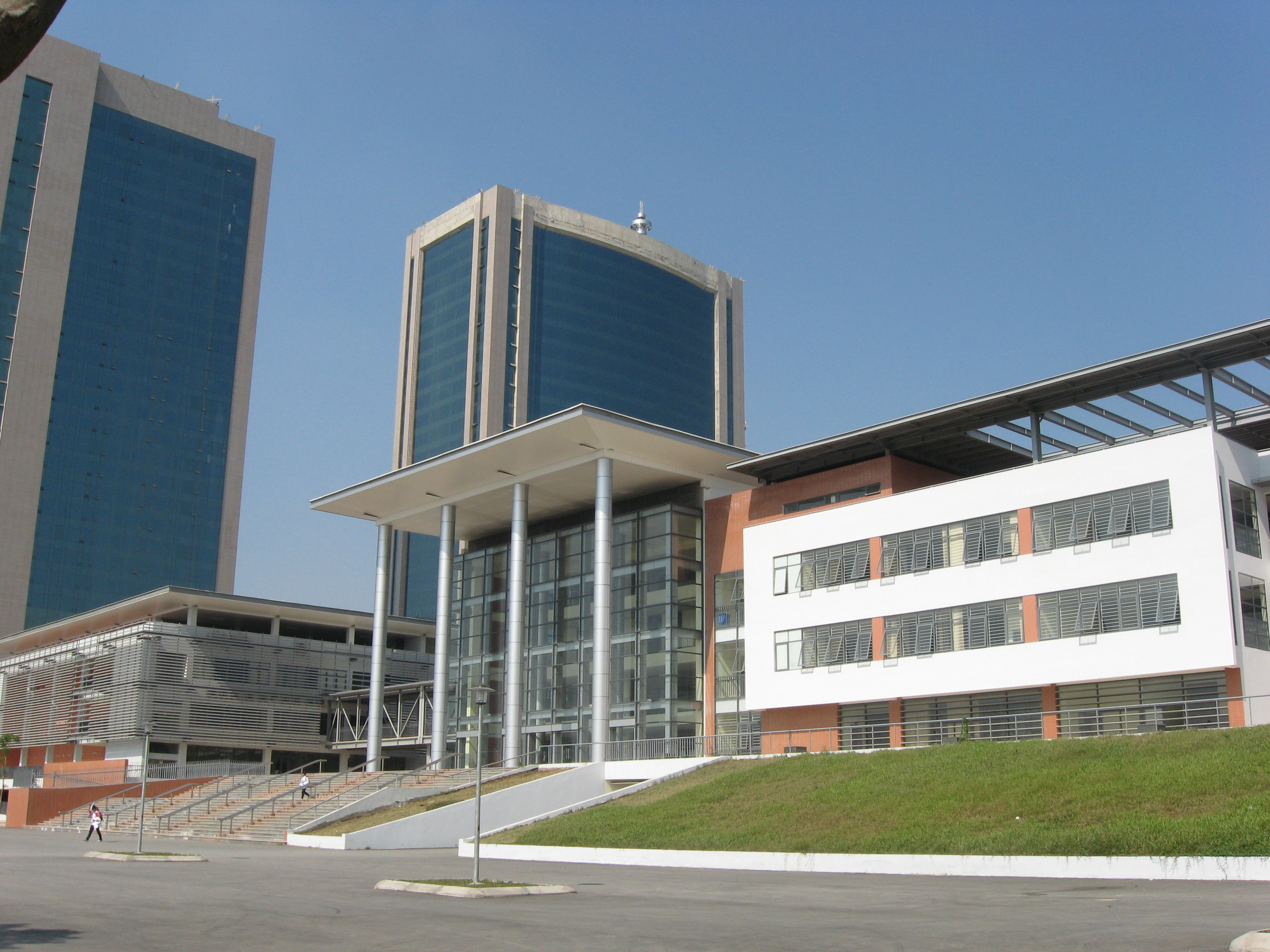
Hanoi – Amsterdam High School

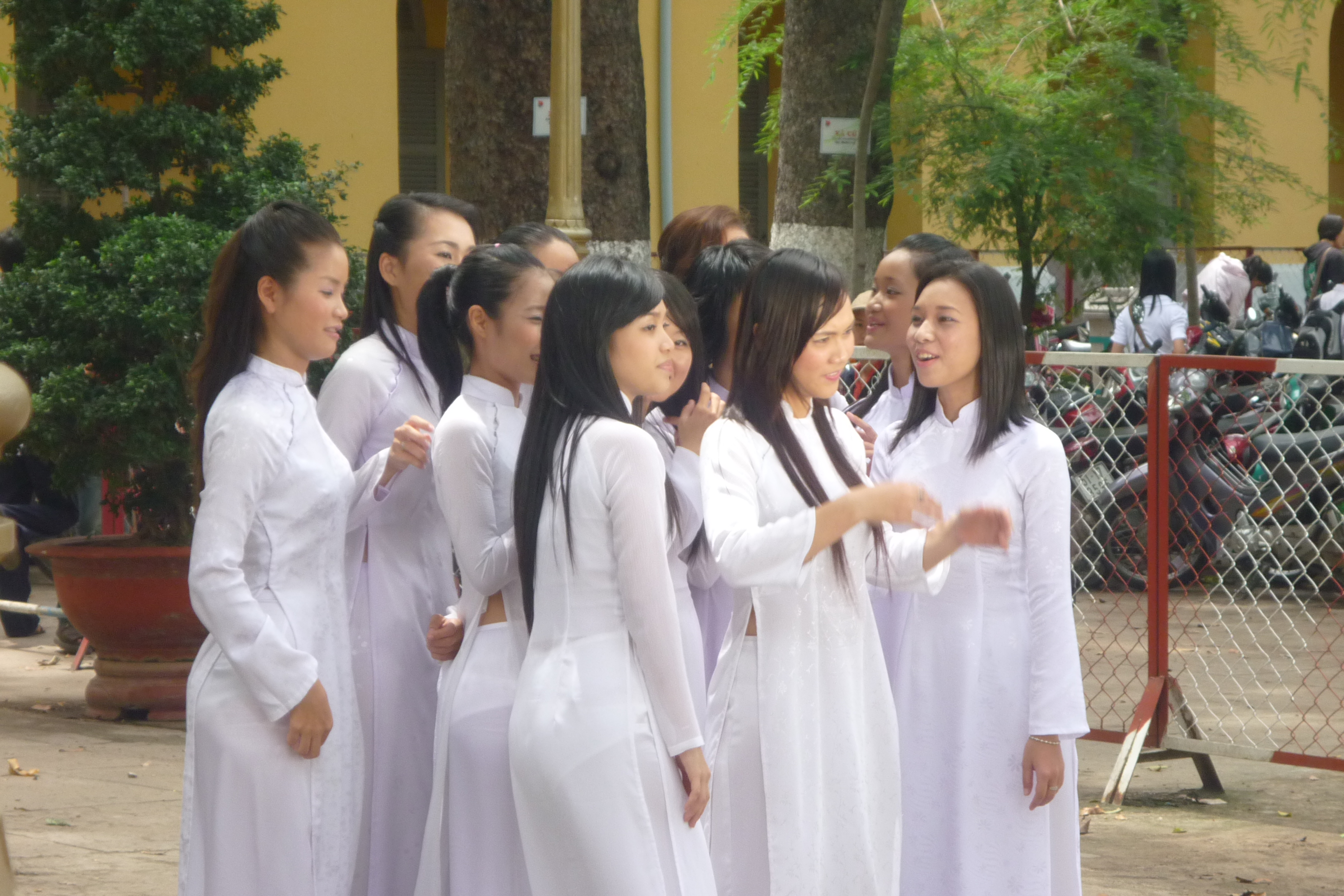
Ho Chi Minh City schoolgirls in ao dai uniform.

Most admission pathways to enter a Vietnamese high school (trung học phổ thông) take the form of a entrance examination. The most mainstream way is through the 10th Grade entrance exam (Kỳ thi tuyển sinh lớp 10), with each province organizing their own. This pathway is for students who wish to enroll in a traditional government-owned public or gifted high school. Students select some high schools they want to attend and rank them. Based on the score of the exam and the student's school choices, they would be assigned a school.

==== Graduation exam ====
The Ministry of Education and Training announced that for the 2017 graduation examination (Kỳ thi Tốt nghiệp Trung học phổ thông), five papers would be included: Mathematics, Literature, Foreign language, Natural Sciences, and Social Sciences. Three papers are mandatory for all students: Mathematics, Literature (the only remaining essay-based exam paper which is the spiritual successor of 1075-1919 exams), and Foreign language. Foreign language exam can be one of the following: English, French, German, Chinese, Japanese, Russian or Korean (since 2021). Apart from three mandatory papers, student must complete a fourth paper by choosing either natural sciences (a combination of Physics, Chemistry, and Biology) or Social Sciences (a combination of History, Geography, and Civic Education). In some cases, before 2020, students can take both the Natural Sciences and Social Sciences and will choose the paper with the higher result to be evaluated.

== University ==
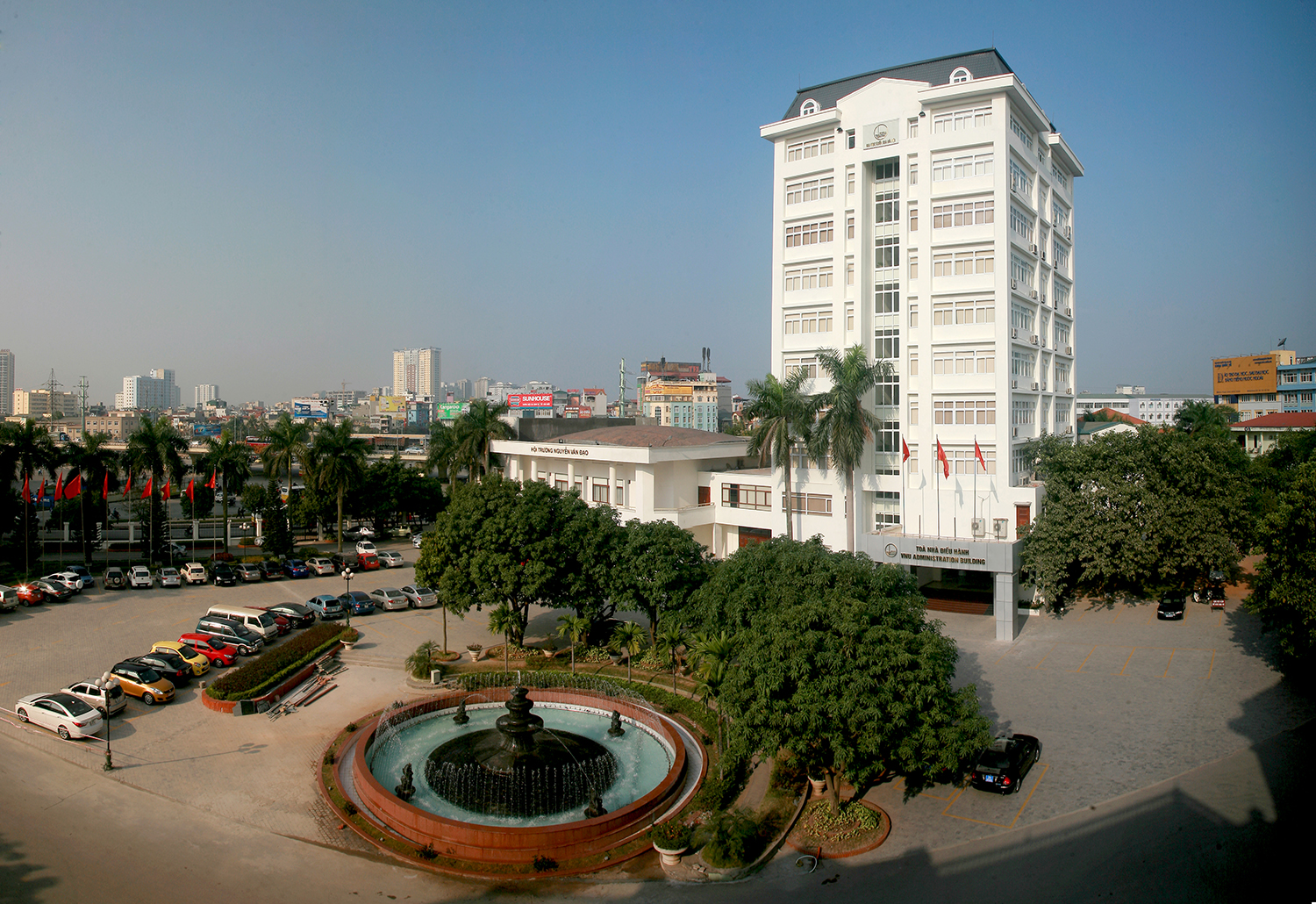
Vietnam National University, Hanoi

From 2002 to 2014, university entrance was based on the scores achieved in the Universities and Colleges Selection Examination (TSĐHCĐ). The TSĐHCĐ and the High School Graduation Examination (TNTHPT) were abolished in 2015 and replaced by a unified test, the National High School Examination (THPTQG). The THPTQG was stopped after 2019, and the TNTHPT resumed. Universities can use the results for admissions, or they can use new self-organized admission tests, such as Aptitude Test used by VNU, VNU-HCM, HNUE, HCMUE, and Vietnamese police academies, or Thinking Skills Assessment used by HUST.

The demand for student placements into universities outweighed the supply, where around 1.3 million students would choose to enroll into universities, only 600,000 could be supplied due to lack of teaching staff at the tertiary level or post-secondary level. This prompted calls for the government to help expand the tertiary sector, especially with increasing trend of enrolments into university from 1990 to 2019.

=== Types ===
Vietnamese Government decree (decree 43/2000/ND-CP, dated August 30, 2000) identified three types of higher education institutions:

- University system (đại học), which is a multidisciplinary institution offering fields of study and which has research capacities. Six major university systems in Vietnam are Vietnam National University, Hanoi; Vietnam National University, Ho Chi Minh City; Hue University; University of Da Nang; Thai Nguyen University; and Hanoi University of Science and Technology.
- University (or college; trường đại học), which is more narrowly focused in its curriculum, sometimes on a single study area.
- Academy (học viện), which is also narrowly focused in terms of study area and which may have a specialized research capacity.

In the school year 2010–2011, Vietnam had 163 universities (including senior colleges and institutes) and 223 junior colleges, in which 50 senior colleges and 30 junior colleges are non-public.

=== Qualifications ===
- Associate Degree (Cao đẳng): a three-year program delivered by junior colleges (including teachers colleges and others) and/or by some universities as additional training programs.
- Bachelor's degree (Cử nhân): a four- to six-year program — six years for students studying medical and dental sciences; five years for students of industrial engineering; and four years for the majority of other undergraduate degrees such as Social Sciences. Graduates receive degrees with a title corresponding to their field of study such as bachelor (cử nhân), engineer (kỹ sư), medical doctor (bác sĩ), or lawyer (luật sư), etc.

== Teaching quality issues ==
Vietnamese diaspora have stated that the higher education system needs to update curricula, move away from a lecturer-centered method of teaching and learning, increase linkage between teaching and research activities, and match theory to practical training so that graduates can find jobs in an economy where skills shortages drive inflation to double-digit levels. Vietnamese students perceive themselves to lack knowledge despite being taught a lot due to an emphasis on achieving high test scores and a lack of real-life implementation. Center for Policy Studies and Analysis- University of Social Sciences and Humanities, Vietnam National University, Hanoi surveyed 3000 respondents in 2009-2010 on graduate employment. 26.2% were unemployed; among those employed, 61% lacked sufficient working skill, 43% lacked experience, and 32% felt insecure in providing professional expertise.

Only primary schools are subsidized by the government, to 50% of the total tuition cost. Primary education quality, particularly in poor areas, is below the required standard. The drop-out rate after fifth grade is higher for those in rural and mountainous area since most students cannot afford to attend secondary school or university due to poverty. Participatory Poverty Assessments (PPAs) found that for some poor households, child labor is considered more valuable than school attendance in short-term economics. For poor families, the opportunity cost of sending their children to school is perceived to be high and the long-term benefit of education cannot outweigh the short-term economic losses. In response to these challenges, the Ministry of Education and Training has implemented a number of educational reforms from 2015 onward.

== English as a second language ==
Private language centers offering English as a second language are in higher demand in the cities of Hanoi and Ho Chi Minh City. Examinations such as TOEFL (Test of English as a Foreign Language) and especially IELTS (International English Language Testing System) have become more popular means of verified International English examinations for universities and other ventures in Viet Nam.

=== National Foreign Languages 2020 Project ===
In 2008, the Vietnamese government officially approved the Foreign Language Teaching and Learning in the National Education System in the 2008-2020 Period plan through Decision No. 1400/QD-TTg. Among other things, it set the goal of seeing 100% of students enrolled in a 10-year foreign language education program by 2020. By 2017, the goal was out of reach so the program was extended to 2025 through Decision 2080/QD-TTg.

== See also ==
- Vietnamese studies
