= High School Graduation Examination =

Standardized test for college admissions in Vietnam

- Logo since 2025
- Acronym: TN THPT
- Type: Paper-based standardized test
- Administrator: Ministry of Education and Training
- Skills tested: Vietnamese Literature, Mathematics, Natural or Social Sciences, and Foreign languages
- Purpose: • High school graduation • Admission to undergraduate programs of universities or junior colleges
- Year started: 2001; 25 years ago
- Duration: Literature: 120 minutes Mathematics: 90 minutes Sciences: 150 minutes (50 minutes for each component subject); Foreign languages: 60 minutes
- Score range: 0–10 (graduation); 0–30 (university entrance)
- Offered: Once a year (Note: In 2020 and 2021, due to the impacts of the COVID-19 pandemic, the TNTHPT was divided into 2 specific phases, the first phase focuses on the less affected provinces and the second phase is for the social-isolation regions in phase 1.)
- Regions: Vietnam
- Languages: Vietnamese (Literature, Mathematics, Sciences); English, Chinese, Japanese, French, German, Russian, Korean (Foreign Languages)
- Annual number of test takers: ▲1,067,391 (in 2024)
- Prerequisites: Students in grade 12 and those who have completed the high school program
- Fee: Free
- Used by: Most universities and junior colleges in Vietnam
- Website: thisinh.thitotnghiepthpt.edu.vn

The High School Graduation Examination (Vietnamese: Kỳ thi tốt nghiệp trung học phổ thông, abbreviated TN THPT) is a standardized test in the Vietnamese education system, held from 2001 to 2014 and again since 2020. It is used to determine high school graduation eligibility and serves as a national university and college entrance examination.

== History ==
The initial purpose was to officially declare a student's completion of high school program and a prerequisite for taking the Universities and Colleges Selection Examination. In 2015, the High School Graduation Examination was merged with the Universities and Colleges Selection Examination and became the National High School Examination (THPTQG). Students took one exam to graduate out of high school and apply to universities, junior colleges. On 2018, the THPTQG examination cheating scandal was regarded as the unprecedented exam cheating in history of Vietnam. It spurred a series of reforms in the organization of the THPTQG in subsequent years, this include the increase of surveillance cameras and the assignment of universities in grading exams. The THPTQG was held annually until 2019.

Since 2020, due to COVID-19 pandemic in Vietnam and new entrance exams organised by universities and junior colleges, such as the Aptitude Tests [vi] (VNU, VNU-HCM, HNUE, HCMUE, Vietnamese police academies, etc.) and HUST Thinking Skills Assessment [vi] (HUST), the THPTQG has been discontinued, replaced by the High School Graduation Examination which is organised again with the same organisation as the THPTQG and with the main purpose of doing well high school career. Universities may still use this exam's results as a basis for university admissions.

Particularly in 2020 and 2021, due to the complicated development of the epidemic in some localities, the exam was divided into 2 specific phases, the first phase focused on the less affected provinces and the second phase was for the social-isolation regions in phase 1. In 2021, candidates who were in places where social distancing was implemented according to Directive No.16 in both phases would be specially considered for recognition of high school graduation. Since 2022, the high school graduation exam has been held only once a year, with the main purpose of high school graduation and enrollment for a number of universities and junior colleges nationwide.

== Contestants ==
Candidates for the High School Graduation Examination include:

- Students in grade 12 are eligible to take the exam (weak academic performance or higher, behaviour average or higher).
- Those who have completed the high school program but have not taken the graduation exam or have taken the exam but have not graduated in previous years.
- Those who have high school diplomas and intermediate diplomas take the exam to get the results as a basis for admission consideration to junior colleges and universities.

== Schedule ==
For the 2025 exams, two official schedules are given for two types of candidates:

High School Graduation Examination schedule (for candidates participating under the 2006 program)
Day	Session	Test		Duration	Time to hand out the test	Test starting time
1	Morning	08:00: Meeting of official monitoring the examination.				
1	Afternoon	14:00: Candidates come to the examination room to complete the exam procedures and listen to the regulations of the examination.				
2	Morning	Literature		120 mins	07:30	07:35
2	Afternoon	Mathematics		90 mins	14:20	14:30
3	Morning	Natural Sciences	Physics	50 mins	07:30	07:35
3	Morning	Natural Sciences	Chemistry	50 mins	08:30	08:35
3	Morning	Natural Sciences	Biology	50 mins	09:30	09:35
3	Morning	Social Sciences	History	50 mins	07:30	07:35
3	Morning	Social Sciences	Geography	50 mins	08:30	08:35
3	Morning	Social Sciences	Civics	50 mins	09:30	09:35
3	Afternoon	Foreign Languages		60 mins	14:20	14:30
4	Contingency					

High School Graduation Examination schedule (for candidates participating under the 2018 program)
Day	Session	Test		Duration	Time to hand out the test	Test starting time
1	Morning	08:00: Meeting of official monitoring the examination.				
1	Afternoon	14:00: Candidates come to the examination room to complete the exam procedures and listen to the regulations of the examination.				
2	Morning	Literature		120 mins	07:30	07:35
2	Afternoon	Mathematics		90 mins	14:20	14:30
3	Morning	Optional Subjects (Note: Candidates are allowed to pick 2 out of the following subjects: Chemistry, Physics, Biology, History, Geography, Economic and Law Education, Informatics, Technology (Industrial, Agricultural), Foreign Languages (English, Chinese, Japanese, Korean, German, French, Russian))	1st Subject	50 mins	07:30	07:35
3	Morning	Optional Subjects	2nd Subject	50 mins	08:35	08:40
4	Contingency					

== Structure ==
=== 2001–2013 ===
Each year (2013 and earlier), students tool 6 subjects in the curriculum, in which there were 3 fixed subjects including Mathematics, Literature, Foreign Languages and 3 subjects that were changed each year (choose from Physics, Chemistry, Biology, History and Geography).

The following was a list of examination subjects by year other than 3 subjects of Mathematics, Literature and Foreign Language from 2001. An alternative exam was a subject used to replace Foreign Language for candidates studying Continuing Education or did not complete the current high school program or had difficulties in studying.

List of subjects by year
Year	Subject 1	Subject 2	Subject 3	Same as year	Alternative subject	Graduation rate	Ref.
2001	Physics	Biology	Geography	—	History		
2002	Physics	History	Chemistry	—	Geography		
2003	Physics	History	Geography	—	Biology		
2004	Biology	Chemistry	Geography	—	History		
2005	Physics	Chemistry	History	2002	Biology	89.00%	
2006	Geography	Chemistry	History	—	Physics	92.00%	
2007	Physics	Chemistry	History	2005	Geography	67.13%	
2008	Physics	Biology	History	—	Chemistry	76.36%	
2009	Physics	Biology	Geography	2001	History	83.60%	
2010	Chemistry	History	Geography	2006	Physics	92.57%	
2011	Physics	Biology	Geography	2009	History	95.72%	
2012	Chemistry	History	Geography	2010	Physics	97.63%	
2013	Chemistry	Biology	Geography	2004	Physics	97.52%	

=== 2014 ===
In 2014, students had 2 compulsory subjects (Literature, Mathematics) and 2 elective subjects in the remaining 6 subjects (Chemistry, Physics, Geography, History, Biology, Foreign Language). The rate of candidates passing graduation nationwide reached 99.02% in the high school education system, 89.01% in the continuing education system, the overall average is 99.09%.

=== 2020–2024 ===
From 2020 up to present, for high school students, they must take 4 exams, including 3 independent tests of Mathematics, Literature, and Foreign Languages and 1 of 2 combined exams of Natural Sciences (Physics, Chemistry, and Biology) or Social Sciences (History, Geography, Civics). For candidates studying in the continuing education program, they shall take 3 exams, including 2 independent tests in Mathematics, Literature and 1 test in combination of Social Sciences (History, Geography).

For the Foreign Language test, candidates can choose from one of the subjects of English language, Chinese language, Japanese language, French language, German language, Russian language and Korean language.

Test	Composition	Format	Duration	Number of questions	Point
Literature	—	Essay	120 mins	6	0.75+0.75+1+0.5+2+5
Mathematics	—	Multiple-choice	90 mins	50	0.2
Natural Sciences	Physics	Multiple-choice	50 mins	120	0.25
Natural Sciences	Chemistry	Multiple-choice	50 mins	120	0.25
Natural Sciences	Biology	Multiple-choice	50 mins	120	0.25
Social Sciences	History	Multiple-choice	50 mins	120	0.25
Social Sciences	Geography	Multiple-choice	50 mins	120	0.25
Social Sciences	Civics	Multiple-choice	50 mins	120	0.25
Foreign Language	—	Multiple-choice	60 mins	50	0.2

=== From 2025 ===
Beginning in 2025, the test will feature two required subjects: Mathematics and Literature. In addition, applicants may pick two courses from the general education curriculum, including Chemistry, Physics, Biology, Geography, History, Economics and Law Education, Informatics, Technology, Foreign Languages (English, German, Russian, Japanese, French, Chinese, Korean)..

The Literature exam is in essay format, consisting of two parts: Reading Comprehension (4 points) and Writing (6 points). Candidates will have 120 minutes to complete the exam.

For the other courses, the test will be multiple-choice with three portions. The amount of questions in each segment varies depending on the topic. Section I has multiple-choice questions with four answers, and applicants must choose one right answer. Section II has questions with true/false alternatives. Section III consists of short-answer questions that require applicants to shade in the right answer. The maximum score on the multiple-choice test is ten. The exam length and amount of questions for each topic are as follows:

Test	Duration	Number of questions			Points awarded (per correct answers)		
Test	Duration	Section I	Section II	Section III	Section I	Section II	Section III
Mathematics	90 mins	12	4	6	0.25	4 correct answers: 1; 3 correct answers: 0.5; 2 correct answers: 0.25; 1 correct answer: 0.1	0.5
Physics	50 mins	18	4	6	0.25	4 correct answers: 1; 3 correct answers: 0.5; 2 correct answers: 0.25; 1 correct answer: 0.1	0.25
Chemistry	50 mins	18	4	6	0.25	4 correct answers: 1; 3 correct answers: 0.5; 2 correct answers: 0.25; 1 correct answer: 0.1	0.25
Biology	50 mins	18	4	6	0.25	4 correct answers: 1; 3 correct answers: 0.5; 2 correct answers: 0.25; 1 correct answer: 0.1	0.25
Geography	50 mins	18	4	6	0.25	4 correct answers: 1; 3 correct answers: 0.5; 2 correct answers: 0.25; 1 correct answer: 0.1	0.25
History	50 mins	24	4	—	0.25	4 correct answers: 1; 3 correct answers: 0.5; 2 correct answers: 0.25; 1 correct answer: 0.1	—
Economics and Law Education	50 mins	24	4	—	0.25	4 correct answers: 1; 3 correct answers: 0.5; 2 correct answers: 0.25; 1 correct answer: 0.1	—
Information Technology	50 mins	24	4	—	0.25	4 correct answers: 1; 3 correct answers: 0.5; 2 correct answers: 0.25; 1 correct answer: 0.1	—
Technology	50 mins	24	4	—	0.25	4 correct answers: 1; 3 correct answers: 0.5; 2 correct answers: 0.25; 1 correct answer: 0.1	—
Foreign Language	50 mins	40	—	—	0.25	—	—

The test will be administered nationally in a consistent format and at the same time as determined by the Ministry of Education and Training. Between 2025 and 2030, the test approach will stay steady with a paper-based structure..

== Admission to universities and colleges ==
=== Basic blocks ===
- Block A00: Mathematics, Physics, Chemistry
  - Block A01: Mathematics, Physics, English
- Block B00: Mathematics, Chemistry, Biology
- Block C00: Literature, History, Geography
- Block D01: Literature, Mathematics, English
  - Block D02: Literature, Mathematics, Russian
  - Block D03: Literature, Mathematics, French
  - Block D04: Literature, Mathematics, Chinese
  - Block D05: Literature, Mathematics, German (since 2008)
  - Block D06: Literature, Mathematics, Japanese (since 2008)
  - Block D07: Mathematics, Chemistry, English
  - Block D78: Literature, Social Sciences, English
  - Block DD2: Literature, Mathematics, Korean (since 2021)

=== Gifted blocks ===
- Block H: Literature, Gifted Art (graphics and drawing with pencil decorating color)
- Block K: Mathematics, Physics, Engineering profession
- Block M: Literature, Mathematics, Gifted (singing, storytelling, expressive reading)
- Block N: Literature, Gifted Music (work evaluation, details, vocals)
- Block R: Literature, History, Gifted Subjects
- Block S: Literature, Gifted Theatre Arts (dancing, vocals, acting)
- Block T: Biology, Mathematics, Gifted Sports (running a short distance, turn on the spot, bent body, required physique measurements)
- Block V: Mathematics, Physics, Drawing

== Scandal ==
=== Leaked Biology exam questions in 2021 ===
After the first round of the 2021 high school graduation exam ended, many people shared information about a teacher in Hà Tĩnh province. This teacher had solved the Biology exam review questions, and many of the questions in the review questions were the same as the official exam questions. Specifically, up to 80% of the questions in the review questions were the same as the official exam questions.

In August 2022, the Vietnamese Ministry of Education and Training reviewed the Biology exam of the 2021 high school graduation exam. The review was conducted after there were many complaints about the overlap between the review content and the exam questions. After careful consideration, the Ministry of Education and Training confirmed that up to 92.5% of the review content was the same as the official exam questions.

On June 10, 2022, the Vietnamese Ministry of Public Security initiated a criminal case for "Abuse of power while performing official duties" that occurred at the Ministry of Education and Training. The two people charged were Ms. Pham Thi My (born in 1963) and Mr. Bui Van Sam (born in 1949), both former lecturers at Hanoi National University of Education. Ms. My and Mr. Sam were accused of abusing their positions to distort the results of the exams, seriously affecting the reputation of the education sector. On June 29, 2023, the Hanoi People's Court opened a trial for the two defendants. The prosecution determined that the official exam questions for the 2021 high school graduation exam had from 70% to 95% of the questions coinciding with the questions compiled and edited by the two defendants. After considering the circumstances, the court sentenced Ms. Pham Thi My to 13 months and 4 days in prison, and Mr. Bui Van Sam to 12 months of non-custodial reform for the above charge.

== See also ==
- Universities and Colleges Selection Examination
