= Trung Vuong =

Trung Vuong (vi:Trưng Vương) may refer to:

- "Trưng 'King'" or "Trưng Queen (regnant)", Trưng Trắc, the older of the Trưng Sisters: leaders who rebelled against Chinese rule for three years, and are regarded as national heroines of Vietnam.

== Schools ==
- Trưng Vương Junior Secondary School, Hanoi: a junior secondary school in Hanoi, Vietnam
- Trưng Vương Junior Secondary School, Nha Trang: a junior secondary school in Nha Trang, Vietnam
