= 2018 National High School Examination cheating scandal =

Education scandal in Vietnam

- Location: Hà Giang Sơn La Hòa Bình
- Inquiries: Ministry of Education and Training; Ministry of Public Security of Vietnam
- Accused: 5 (Hà Giang); 12 (Sơn La); 15 (Hòa Bình)

The 2018 National High School Examination cheating scandal (Vietnamese: Vụ gian lận kỳ thi Trung học phổ thông Quốc gia 2018) was a case of misconduct in the administration and grading of the 2018 National High School Examination in Vietnam.

The incident involved numerous altered exam scores across the provinces of Hà Giang, Sơn La, and Hòa Bình, in which exam scores of 222 students were found to have been manipulated. After the incident was brought to light, several education officials were arrested. Some members of the Communist Party of Vietnam were expelled and received penalties ranging from Party discipline to 21 years' imprisonment.

This scandal is considered one of the most serious cases of academic cheating in the history of Vietnam.

== Background ==
The National High School Examination was a standardized examination administered in Vietnam from 2015 to 2019. It was introduced in 2014 by combining the High School Graduation Examination and the university entrance examination into a single test. The examination results were used both to determine eligibility for high school graduation and admission to universities and colleges.

Candidates were required to take four examinations of four subjects. Three compulsory subjects included Mathematics, Literature, and Foreign Language. Candidates also had to choose one of Physics, Chemistry, Biology, History, or Geography.

Prior to the 2018 examination, Hà Giang and Sơn La recorded relatively low examination performance compared with the national average. In the 2017 National High School Examination, the graduation rate in Hà Giang Province was 89.64%, with more than 5,200 candidates, making it one of the lowest rates in the country. Sơn La Province recorded an average score of 3.3051 out of 10, the lowest provincial average in the nation, while 51 candidates failed the Mathematics examination. In Hòa Bình Province, the graduation rate was higher than the two provinces, with 96.94%.

== 2018 National High School Examination ==
The 2018 National High School Examination was the fourth annual examination since its establishment. It was held from 25 to 27 June, with 925,792 candidates in the country officially registered, and approximately 45,000 officials and lecturers participated in administering the exam process.

On 27 June, after students had completed the exam, the tests drew public attention because of their difficulty. Several students claimed that the questions were more difficult than in previous years, some even cried after leaving the examination venues. Some teachers said that they also found the exam difficult to complete within the given time, and a perfect score of 10 would no longer be common. The Math subject was criticized by academics who argued that it was too long to finish in the given 90 minutes, harder than the previous mock tests. One of the professors told the Dân Trí newspaper that "the practical questions are simply made-up, lacking realism and scientific verification". Professor Nguyễn Tiến Dũng of the University of Toulouse, a gold medalist at the International Mathematical Olympiad, said that it took him 60 minutes to solve 4 questions and the last question is "impossible" to solve within another 60 minutes. In response, Sái Công Hồng, in charge of the Exam Question Council, stated that "the organizing committee has followed the announcement correctly" and "candidates were informed early on, while still in 11th grade, so they weren't caught off guard".

== Suspicions ==
On 11 July 2018, the exam result was announced by the Ministry of Education and Training (MOET). Mountainous provinces, including Hà Giang and Sơn La, recorded unusually high numbers of high-scoring students in certain subjects. This had raised questions from the public. In Mathematics, the percentage of Hà Giang students scoring higher than 9 points out of 10 was 1.049%, in Sơn La and Hòa Bình was 0.3%, higher than many provinces with strong academic performance like Hà Nội (0.1%), Nam Định (0.06%), Hồ Chí Minh City (0.04%). A student in Hòa Bình allegedly exposed their province for irregularities through private messages to a teacher. Bạc Liêu, Tuyên Quang, and 35 students from Lạng Sơn were also under suspicion.

When a reporter from Tuổi Trẻ tried to interview students from Hà Giang and Sơn La, who ranked in top 11 candidates with the highest score in the country, they described those candidates as "inexplicably reserved" compared to others in other provinces. According to the reporter, one candidate ended the phone call shortly after learning that the caller was a journalist. Following the publication of the results, several students became targets of online criticism and mocking comments.

== Investigations ==
=== Hà Giang ===
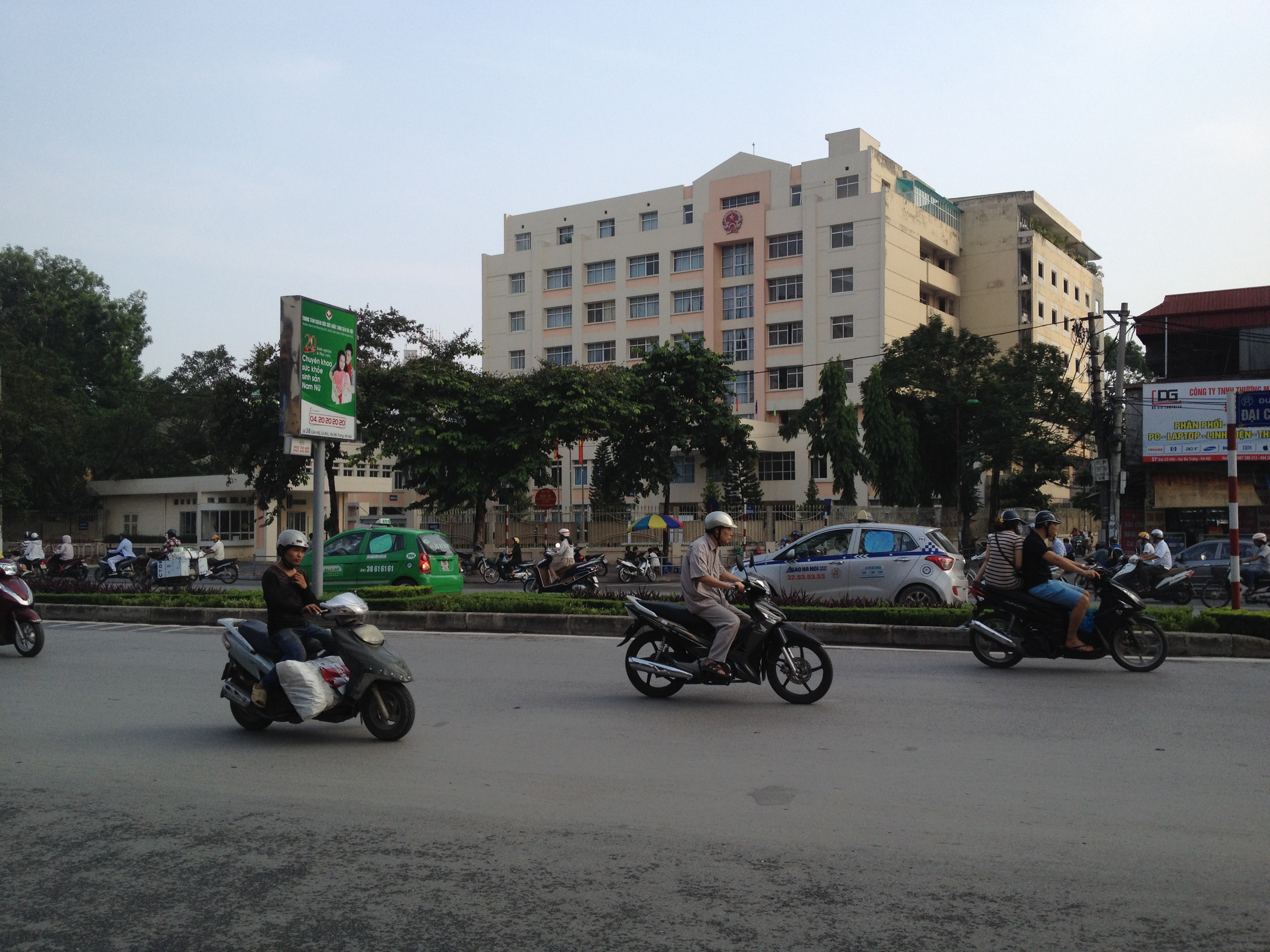
Headquarters of the Ministry of Education and Training in Hanoi.

The MOET ordered an investigation into examination results in Hà Giang on 12 July 2018. Deputy MOET Nguyễn Hữu Độ signed the Official Document No. 2868/BGDDT-QLCL requesting that Hà Giang Province conduct an inspection and submit a report before 17 July, citing media reports regarding unusual exam results. One day later, a task force from the MOET and the Ministry of Public Security (MPS) arrived in Hà Giang. On July 15, the MOET Phùng Xuân Nhạ established a council to review test papers at the Hà Giang Department of Education and Training Examination Board.

At a press conference on 17 July, Mai Văn Trinh, Director of the Quality Management Department of MOET, announced that there was evidence that examination scores had been manipulated after all multiple-choice answer sheets had been re-examined. After the original scores were restored, more than 330 examination papers belonging to 114 candidates differed by more than one point from the previously announced results. The initial investigation showed that Vũ Trọng Lương, the Deputy Head of the Examination and Quality Management Department in Hà Giang, was identified as being directly involved in changing exam results. The task force also found many messages on Lương's phone that included students' registration numbers. Lương admitted that he had opened sealed bags containing examination papers, removed the answer sheets, and changed incorrect answers to correct ones over a period of more than two hours. Investigators estimated that altering each answer sheet took approximately six seconds. Lương was then placed in three months' pre-trial detention on charges of "Abusing position and power while performing official duties".

On 23 August 2019, authorities charged Vũ Trọng Lương; Nguyễn Thanh Hoài, Head of the Examination and Quality Management Division of the Hà Giang DOET; Phạm Văn Khuôn and Triệu Thị Chính, former Deputy Director of the Hà Giang DOET; and a police officer in connection with the scandal. Previously, the latter four individuals had requested that Lương inflate the scores of several candidates. Hoài and Lương both stated that they only helped raise scores due to personal relationships. On 1 October 2019, Hà Giang authorities announced a list of 151 officials and members of the Communist Party of Vietnam who had been found to be involved in the scandal.

=== Sơn La ===
On 19 July 2018, the MOET, in coordination with the MPS, established a working group to verify examination results in Sơn La Province. Two days later, Trinh announced that they had discovered signs of violations in the grading process and manipulation in the examination scores. On 31 July, six officials were charged for "Abusing position and power while performing official duties". On 23 March 2019, after an investigation, the MOET announced that there were 44 candidates who had received inflated scores on 95 multiple-choice examination papers and two Literature examination papers.

Previously, on 28 June 2018, a member of the provincial examination steering committee Trần Xuân Yến received a request from Director of the DOET of Sơn La Hoàng Tiến Đức to raise 8 candidates' scores. Later, the Head of the Secondary Education Department of the DOET of Sơn La Nguyễn Ngọc Hà requested that the scores of four additional candidates be increased, two of whom had already appeared on the previous list. Yến compiled a list containing the information of 13 students whose scores he had to raise and handed it to Nguyễn Thị Hồng Nga, a member of the team processing multiple-choice test papers. From 29 June to 3 July, Nga and three other persons altered scores of the candidates by erasing incorrect answers and replacing them with the correct ones. All four of them admitted to receiving a total of ₫3,280,000,000 (US$108,118.23) from additional parents to raise their candidates' scores; however, many of the parents denied giving the money.

=== Hòa Bình ===
Location of Hòa Bình province.

On 21 July 2018, the MOET established three review teams at the examination boards in Hòa Bình. The teams reassessed all exam papers that had scores of 8 points or above but found no evidence of irregularities. MOET subsequently requested the MPS to carry out an investigation. On 2 August, Deputy Director of the DOET of Hòa Bình Nguyễn Đức Lương confirmed that there were irregularities in the exam scores, including inconsistencies in the timing of the multiple-choice test grading and the computers used for grading. The next day, the Security Investigation Agency of the MPS announced that it had charged two officials: Specialist in the Examination Department of the Hòa Bình DOET Nguyễn Khắc Tuấn, deputy principal of Lạc Thủy Secondary and High School Đỗ Mạnh Tuấn. Both are accused of "Abusing their position and power while doing their official jobs" and temporarily detained for four months. Mai Văn Trinh later confirmed that there were 64 candidates who cheated, one candidate's scores had also been altered in the 2017 National High School Examination. (Note: Some sources said that there were 65 candidates, include one candidate's scores had also been altered in the 2017 Examination.) During the exam grading process, from 30 June to 3 July, member of the exam steering committee Nguyễn Quang Vinh provided Mạnh Tuấn and Khắc Tuấn the key to unlock the room containing examination papers, erased the incorrect answers and used a pencil to fill in the correct one. After the exam results were announced, Mạnh Tuấn received a total of ₫1,050,000,000 (US$39,973.35) from some parents as a "thank you gift".

On 20 September 2019, a total of 15 people related were prosecuted.

=== Lạng Sơn ===
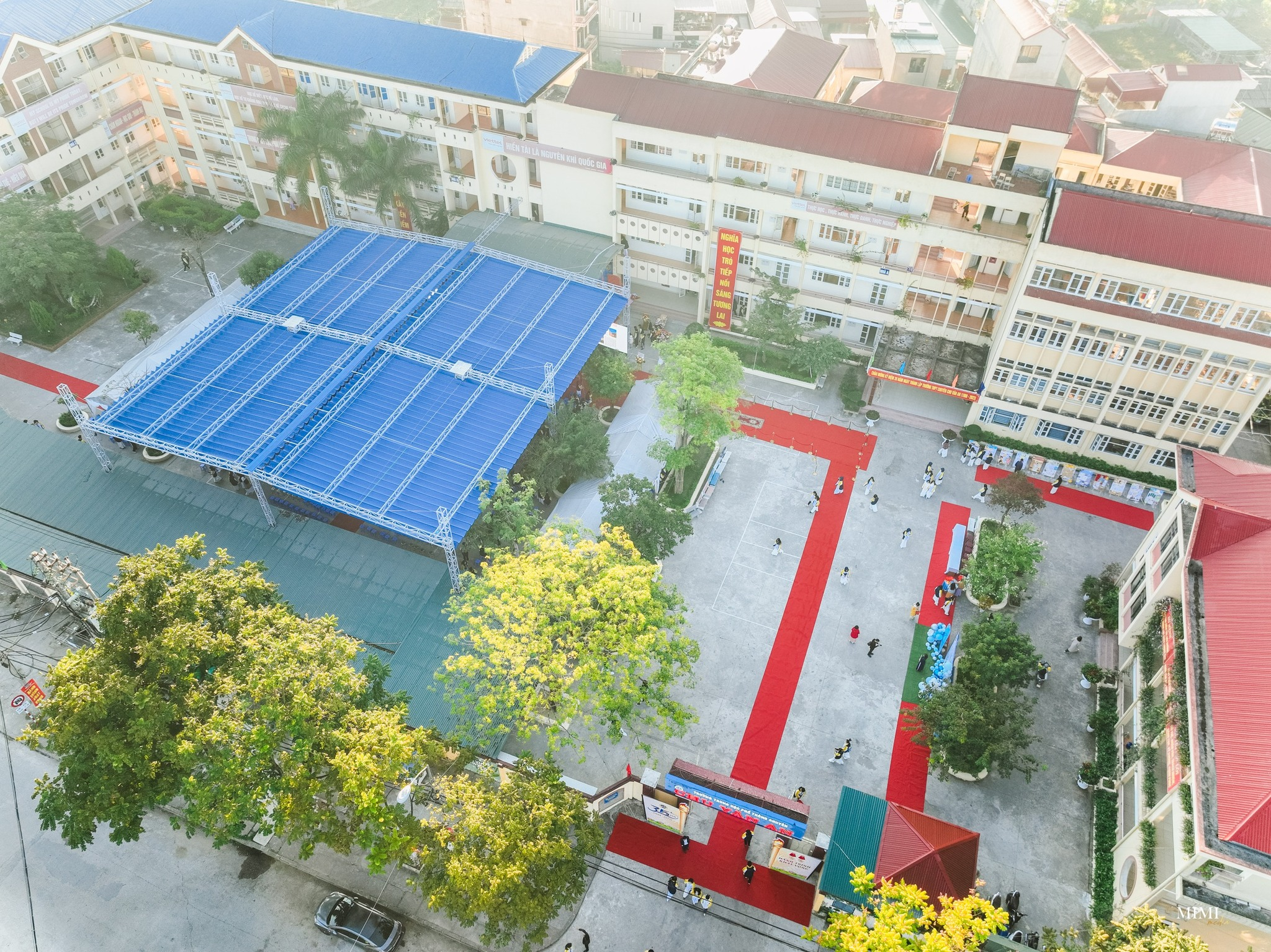
Campus of Chu Văn An High School, Lạng Sơn.

On 18 July 2018, Vice Chairman of the People's Committee of Lạng Sơn Hồ Tiến Thiệu said that he had received information about 35 exam papers in the province with unusual scores and had also started an investigation into alleged irregularities involving 35 candidates, focused on the Chu Văn An High School examination board. All of the mentioned candidates were police officers serving in the 2nd Battalion of the Mobile Police Command who had registered as independent candidates, taking the exam at Chu Văn An High School for the Gifted in Lạng Sơn City. The next day, a task force from the MOET, under the direction of Minister Phùng Xuân Nhạ, arrived to verify signs of irregularities.

On 21 July, a press conference was conducted by the working group of the MOET and the DOET of Lạng Sơn to announce the early findings after three days of investigation. The findings indicated that no instances of cheating were found; however, the scores of 8 exam papers were lowered following a re-assessment of 51 Literature essays.

== Punishment ==
=== Hà Giang ===
Among 151 officials who were involved in the scandal, 2 cases had already received warnings, 137 cases were disciplined by the Hà Giang Provincial Party Committee, while 12 were beyond the provincial Party committee's jurisdiction. Of the 46 found to have violations, 42 received reprimands, 1 a warning, and 3 were expelled from the Communist Party. Additionally, 29 individuals were required to conduct self-criticism. As of 2 October 2019, disciplinary proceedings against 57 officials and Party members remained ongoing, while four cases had been temporarily suspended. One case was closed after investigators found no violations.

At the first-instance trial on 25 October 2019, the People's Court of Hà Giang Province sentenced Nguyễn Thanh Hoài to eight years' imprisonment, Vũ Trọng Lương to seven years, Triệu Thị Chính and Lê Thị Dung to two years each, while Phạm Văn Khuông received a one-year suspended prison sentence. The trial panel concluded that Hoài had masterminded the scheme, while Lương had directly altered the examination papers. At the appeal hearing on 26 February 2020, the High People's Court in Hanoi reduced Triệu Thị Chính's sentence from 24 months to 15 months' imprisonment. The sentences of the remaining defendants were upheld.

=== Sơn La ===
Out of 100 party members under investigation, the Sơn La Provincial Inspection Committee disciplined 83 officials and party members in the scandal; additionally, 9 Party members received severe reprimands; 6 Party members were under investigation as of 5 November 2019; and 2 Party members have not yet been reviewed. As a result, the MPS has expelled 25 candidates who cheated in the examination and sent them back to their local preliminary selection units. Of those returned, 7 were accepted into the People's Security Academy, 16 into the Vietnam People's Police Academy, and 2 into the Fire Prevention and Fighting University.

On 8 May 2020, authorities charged 12 defendants with bribery and abuse of power. Under Vietnamese law, the charges against Lò Văn Huynh and Nguyễn Thị Hồng Nga carried a maximum penalty of death. Both were accused of "Abusing position and authority while performing official duties" and "Receiving bribes". On 29 May 2020, after considering the aggravating and mitigating circumstances, the People's Court of Sơn La Province sentenced the 12 defendants to prison terms ranging from 24 months to 21 years. Huynh and Nga received prison sentences of 21 years and 19 years and 6 months respectively. At the appeal hearing on 20 November 2020, the High People's Court in Hanoi rejected the appeals of four defendants.

=== Hòa Bình ===
On 21 May 2020, the People's Court of Hòa Bình Province issued its judgment against 15 defendants involved in the 2018 exam cheating scandal in Hòa Bình. Đỗ Mạnh Tuấn received the longest sentence of 10 years in prison, the only person who was convicted of both "Abusing position and authority while performing official duties" and "Receiving bribes". At the appeal hearing on 22 October, the High People's Court in Hanoi rejected Nguyễn Quang Vinh's appeal, reduced Khương Ngọc Chất's sentence from six years to five years and Đỗ Mạnh Tuấn's sentence from 10 years to 9 years. Accordingly, 45 admitted students were expelled from their universities.

=== The Ministry of Education and Training ===
On 21 August 2019, the Ministry of Education and Training issued a document considering disciplinary action against 13 ministry officials, including Mai Văn Trinh and Sái Công Hồng. The document was revoked on 9 September as procedural deficiencies were identified, and the ministry instead handled the matter under the Communist Party of Vietnam's disciplinary procedures. On 23 April 2020, the ministry concluded that, although the officials had shown shortcomings in the leadership and administration of the 2018 National High School Examination, their conduct did not warrant formal disciplinary action. They were instead required to conduct self-criticism.

== Public and media reaction ==
"On behalf of the Ministry of Education and Training, we and I personally, as the minister and head of the sector, accept responsibility for the shortcomings in the exam,"
"Personally, I am also deeply concerned and clearly see my responsibility,"

— Minister of Education and Training Phùng Xuân Nhạ.

The 2018 exam cheating scandal was described by domestic press as the most serious education scandal in the country's examination history. BBC News Vietnamese commented that Phùng Xuân Nhạ, Minister of Education and Training, "cannot escape responsibility" for the violations. The Ministry of Education and Training also faced criticism by some members and representatives of the National Assembly of Vietnam. Writer Tuấn Anh from Pháp Luật Thành phố Hồ Chí Minh Newspaper pointed out that the vast majority of candidates who received these "manipulated scores" did not come from "ordinary families", he also criticized the civil servants who got their hands involved.

Some people believe that the identities of the parents of the candidates involved should be made public to help combat corruption. According to a poll by the 24h News program on Vietnam Television with almost two thousands participants, 89% of voters supported the public disclosure of parents' identities. In another poll by VnExpress on 14 April 2019, which asked "In your opinion, should the identities of parents and students who bought exam scores be made public?", 3.874 voters (67%) chose "Yes", 401 (7%) said "No" and 1.492 (26%) chose "Only parents' indentity should be made public". Later, on 18 April, Người đưa tin Newspaper published the names of 15 candidates from Hòa Bình who cheated, Tiền Phong Newspaper revealed the parents of 44 students involved in Sơn La.
