= Vietnamese Standardized Test of English Proficiency =

- Acronym: VSTEP
- Type: Language proficiency test
- Administrator: Ministry of Education and Training (Vietnam)
- Purpose: Assessment of English language proficiency according to Vietnam's 6-level foreign language framework
- Year started: 2014
- Duration: Listening: 40 minutes; Reading: 60 minutes; Writing: 60 minutes; Speaking: 12 minutes
- Score range: 0–10
- Offered: Multiple times per year
- Languages: English
- Fee: Varies by institution

The Vietnamese Standardized Test of English Proficiency (VSTEP) is a national standardized test of English language proficiency for speakers in Vietnam. It is managed by the Ministry of Education and Training and was established in 2014. VSTEP is one of the primary English-language tests in Vietnam. The test has separate formats: one for level A2 and a unified examination for levels 3-5 (corresponding to B1-C1 on the CEFR). In 2023, the Ministry authorized 25 universities to administer the test and issue certificates, expanding to 36 institutions by February 2025.

VSTEP is accepted by most Vietnamese academic institutions for admissions, graduation requirements, and exemptions from English exams, as well as by various professional organizations across the country.

VSTEP meets requirements for exemptions in high school graduation exams for English, where it is the only domestic certificate recognized for this purpose alongside international options like IELTS and TOEFL. It is also used for postgraduate admissions and professional advancements, though some institutions prefer international certificates like IELTS due to perceived prestige.

No minimum score is required to pass the test. A VSTEP result is issued to all test takers with a score from 0 to 10, mapping to proficiency levels, with no level assigned below 4.0. Certificates do not specify an expiration date, though some applications, such as master's programs, consider them valid for two years. Institutions are advised to verify ongoing proficiency for older certificates.

== History ==
VSTEP was introduced in 2014 by Vietnam's Ministry of Education and Training to standardize English proficiency assessments based on the national 6-level foreign language framework. In November 2022, regulatory changes on foreign language certifications led many universities to adopt VSTEP alongside international tests like IELTS and TOEFL. By 2023, 25 universities were authorized to conduct the exam and issue certificates. This number increased to 36 institutions in February 2025, enhancing accessibility.

== Test structure ==
VSTEP assesses four language skills in separate sections:

- Listening comprehension: 35 questions over 40 minutes, including announcements (8 questions), dialogues (12 questions), and lectures (15 questions), all multiple-choice.
- Reading comprehension: 40 questions in 60 minutes, based on four passages totaling about 2,000 words, testing inference, main ideas, and vocabulary.
- Writing: 60 minutes for two tasks—a letter or email (one-third of score) and a 250-word essay (two-thirds of score).
- Speaking: 12 minutes in three parts—social interaction (3-6 questions), solution discussion with reasoning, and topic development with follow-ups.

The structure aligns with CEFR standards for comprehensive evaluation.

== Levels and scoring ==
VSTEP covers levels A2 to C1, aligned with the CEFR:

- A2 level: Scored out of 100 (normalized to 0-10), with each skill at 25%. Passing requires 6.5.
- Levels 3-5 (B1-C1): Unified test scored 0-10: 4.0–5.9 (B1), 6.0–8.4 (B2), 8.5–10 (C1). Below 4.0 receives no level.

== Recognition ==
VSTEP certificates are recognized primarily in Vietnam for university admissions, graduation, and professional purposes. Despite structural similarities to IELTS and TOEFL, adoption has been slower due to preferences for international prestige.
