= Faculty of Medical Sciences of Minas Gerais =

Private university in Belo Horizonte, Brazil

- Faculdade Ciências de Minas Gerais
- Motto: Nunquam satis discitur
- Motto in English: One never learns enough
- Type: Private, non-profit
- Established: 1950; 76 years ago
- Founder: Lucas Machado
- Location: Belo Horizonte, Minas Gerais, Brazil; 19°55′27″S 43°55′52″W,
- Campus: Urban
- Website: cmmg.edu.br

The Faculty of Medical Sciences of Minas Gerais (Portuguese: Faculdade Ciências Médicas de Minas Gerais, FCMMG) is a private university in Belo Horizonte, Minas Gerais, Brazil. Founded in 1950 by Brazilian doctor Lucas Monteiro Machado, it became the second medical school established in the state, following the UFMG School of Medicine.

== History ==
In 1950, Brazilian obstetrician and gynecologist Lucas Monteiro Machado founded the faculty alongside ten fellow physicians from the Santa Casa da Misericórdia de Belo Horizonte (SCBH). The project was supported by Dom Antônio dos Santos Cabral, who at the time served as metropolitan archbishop of Belo Horizonte and president of Sociedade Mineira de Cultura (English: Society of Culture of Minas Gerais), the organization responsible for maintaining the Catholic University of Minas Gerais, now known as the Pontifical Catholic University of Minas Gerais. The first campus was established in the Childrens Hospital Elvira Gomes Nogueira, owned by SCBH, and remained there until the opening of Campus I in 1964. In 1959, following the creation of the unified PUC-MG, the institution could no longer be maintained as a separate entity under the administration of Sociedade Mineira de Cultura. As a result, a vote was held, and the council opted for complete separation from the Catholic University, establishing the institution as an independent entity under the administration of the newly created Sociedade Mineira de Ensino Médico (English: Society of Medical Education of Minas Gerais) in 1960, which would later become Fundação Educacional Lucas Machado (FELUMA).

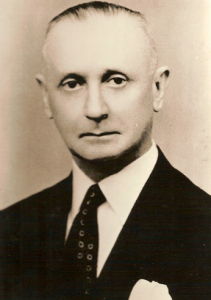
Portrait of Lucas Machado

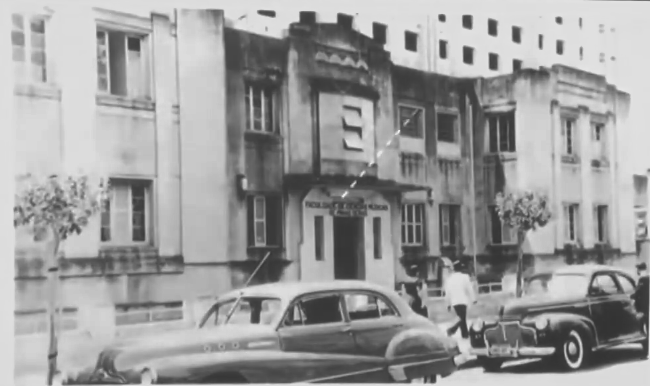
First campus in SCBH

== Facilities ==
The faculty consists of eight buildings, four of which are designated as campuses. Campus I, established on land donated by the state in 1955 at the initiative of Governor Juscelino Kubitschek, has served as the main campus since 1964. Campus II houses the outpatient clinic, while Campus III is home to the School of Dentistry. Campus IV, recently acquired from the Brazilian Red Cross, is currently under renovation and will also house an outpatient clinic. The Ciências Médicas University Hospital (HUCM-MG) serves as the faculty's teaching hospital. The institution also includes an ophtalmology institute (IOCM-MG) and an oncology institute (IONCM-MG), both of which were founded in 2010 and 2024 respectively.

== Organization and administration ==
The maintaining institution of the college is Fundação Educacional Lucas Machado (English: Lucas Machado Educational Foundation), which is responsible for administration and management of the faculty's funds. Although FELUMA is responsible for administration and finance, directorship is separated between the faculty and the maintaining institution.

== Academics ==
Six degrees are currently being offered (arranged by order of creation): Medicine, Physical therapy, Nursing, Psychology, Dentistry and Speech–language pathology. Occupational therapy also used to be offered by the faculty and was created alongside the Physical therapy course, but stopped being lectured since the second semester of 2014.

== Admissions and costs ==
Students are admitted through a college entrance exam, held twice a year for the Medicine program and once a year for the remaining programs. ENEM scores are also accepted for admission to the other courses. The tuition fee for the Medicine course is $1,899 per month, which is significantly higher than that of other programs. Scholarships are also offered through ProUni.
