= Universities and Colleges Selection Examination =

Vietnamese former standardized test

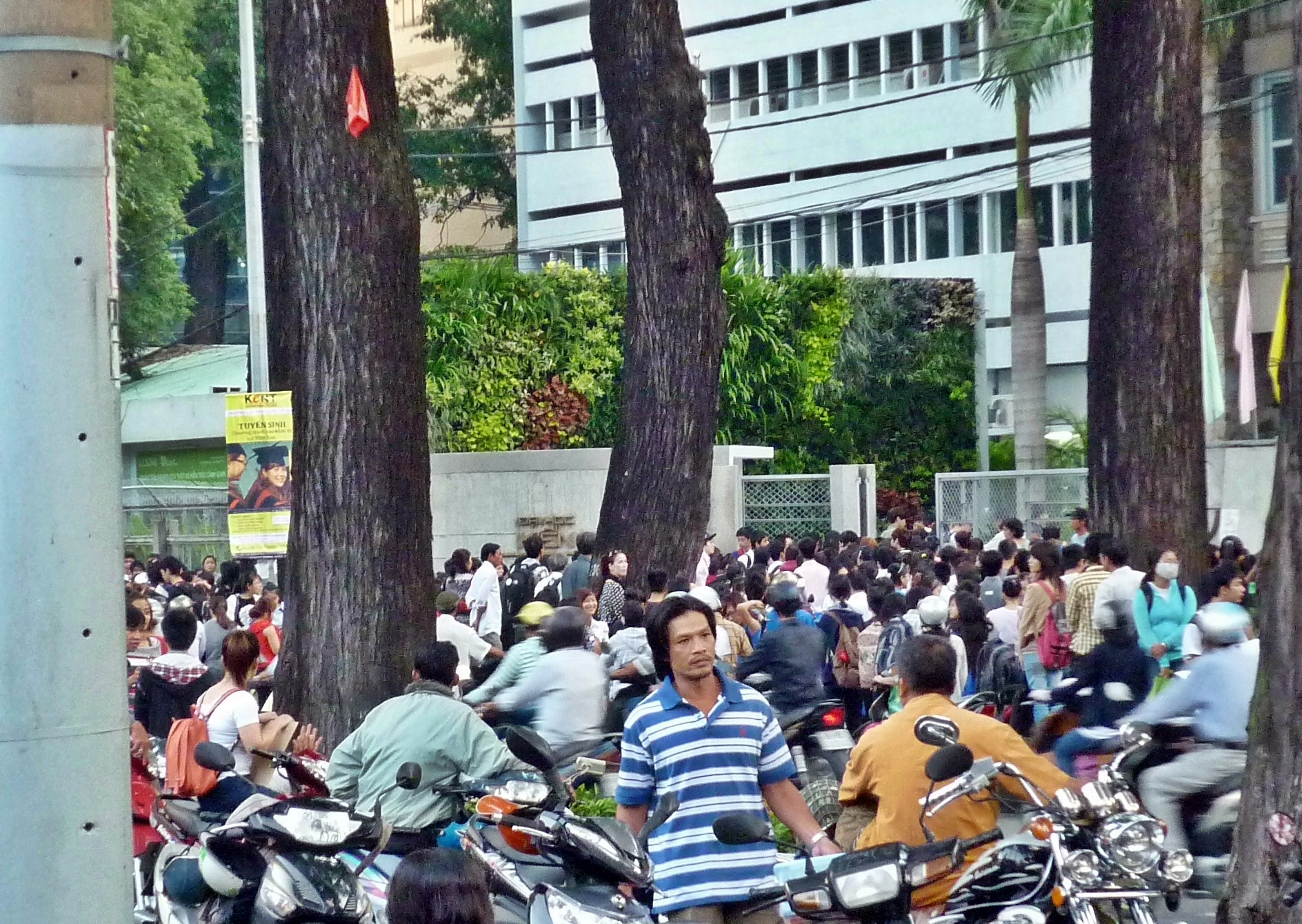
Parents and students at the entrance exam of Ho Chi Minh City University of Architecture, 2012.

Universities and Colleges Selection Examination (TSĐHCĐ; Vietnamese: Kỳ thi tuyển sinh đại học và cao đẳng) was a type of standardized test that is no longer used by public and some private universities and junior college in Vietnam. Established in 2002, it was known roughly as the exam of 3 chung (same time, same questions and same results). The test by the Ministry of Education and Training held annually, one year later than Vietnamese High School Graduation Examination (Kỳ thi tốt nghiệp trung học phổ thông). In the years of being organized, it was held in the first and middle of July according to the following schedule:

- Session 1: July 4 & July 5: exams for blocks A, A1, V of the university system. Candidates taking the V-block exam, after taking the Math and Physics tests, then continue to take the fine art aptitude test until July 8 (depending on the university).
- Session 2: July 9 & July 10, exams for blocks B, C, D, N, H, M, T, S, R, K of the university system. Candidates take the aptitude test, after participating in the cultural subjects (blocks H and N take the exam for Literature according to the exam questions of block C; block M takes the exam in Literature and Mathematics according to the exam questions of block D; block T takes the exam in Biology and Mathematics according to the exam questions of Block B; Block R taking Literature and History exams according to the exam questions of Block C; Block K taking Math and Physics exams according to the exam questions of Block A), then the gifted subjects of fine art, P.E., etc. music and engineering through July 14 (depending on universities).
- Session 3: July 15 & July 16, exam for all blocks of the junior college system.

Since 2015, the exam have been abolished (along with the High School Graduation Examination), to be replaced by a unified test, which is the National High School Examination (Vietnamese: Kỳ thi trung học phổ thông quốc gia, THPTQG). The THPTQG was stopped after 2019, then High School Graduation Examination was held again, with the results able to be used by universities for admission or consider admission based on the results of new self-organized admission tests, such as Aptitude Test (VNU, VNU-HCM, HNUE, HCMUE and Vietnamese police academies), or Thinking Skills Assessment (HUST).

== Contestant ==
Who has a high school graduation certificates or equivalent level study (supplementary, secondary vocational school).

== Exam blocks and subjects ==
Basic blocks:

- Block A: Mathematics, Physics, Chemistry
  - Block A00: Mathematics, Physics, Chemistry
  - Block A01: Mathematics, Physics, English language
  - Block A02: Mathematics, Physics, Biology
  - Block A03: Mathematics, Physics, History
  - Block A04: Mathematics, Physics, Geography
  - Block A05: Mathematics, Chemistry, History
  - Block A06: Mathematics, Chemistry, Geography
  - Block A07: Mathematics, History, Geography
  - Block A08: Mathematics, History, Citizenship education
  - Block A09: Mathematics, Geography, Citizenship education
  - Block A10: Mathematics, Physics, Citizenship education
  - Block A11: Mathematics, Chemistry, Citizenship education
  - Block A12: Mathematics, Natural science, Social science
  - Block A14: Mathematics, Natural science, Geography
  - Block A15: Mathematics, Natural science, Citizenship education
  - Block A16: Mathematics, Natural science, Literature
  - Block A17: Mathematics, Physics, Social science
  - Block A18: Mathematics, Chemistry, Social science
- Block B: Mathematics, Biology, Chemistry
  - Block B00: Mathematics, Biology, Chemistry
  - Block B01: Mathematics, Biology, History
  - Block B02: Mathematics, Biology, Geography
  - Block B03: Mathematics, Biology, Literature
  - Block B04: Mathematics, Biology, Citizenship education
  - Block B05: Mathematics, Biology, Social science
  - Block B08: Mathematics, Biology, English language
- Block C: Literature, History, Geography
  - Block C00: Literature, History, Geography
  - Block C01: Literature, Mathematics, Physics
  - Block C02: Literature, Mathematics, Chemistry
  - Block C03: Literature, Mathematics, History
  - Block C04: Literature, Mathematics, Geography
  - Block C05: Literature, Physics, Chemistry
  - Block C06: Literature, Physics, Biology
  - Block C07: Literature, Physics, History
  - Block C08: Literature, Chemistry, Biology
  - Block C09: Literature, Physics, Geography
  - Block C10: Literature, Chemistry, History
  - Block C12: Literature, Biology, History
  - Block C13: Literature, Biology, Geography
  - Block C14: Literature, Mathematics, Citizenship education
  - Block C15: Literature, Mathematics, Social science
  - Block C16: Literature, Physics, Citizenship education
  - Block C17: Literature, Chemistry, Citizenship education
  - Block C19: Literature, History, Citizenship education
  - Block C20: Literature, Geography, Citizenship education
- Block D: Literature, Mathematics, Foreign Language
  - Block D01: Literature, Mathematics, English language
  - Block D02: Literature, Mathematics, Russian language
  - Block D03: Literature, Mathematics, French language
  - Block D04: Literature, Mathematics, Chinese language
  - Block D05: Literature, Mathematics, German language
  - Block D06: Literature, Mathematics, Japanese language
  - Block D07: Mathematics, Chemistry, English language
  - Block D08: Mathematics, Biology, English language
  - Block D09: Mathematics, History, English language
  - Block D10: Mathematics, Geography, English language
  - Block D11: Literature, Physics, English language
  - Block D12: Literature, Chemistry, English language
  - Block D13: Literature, Biology, English language
  - Block D14: Literature, History, English language
  - Block D15: Literature, Geography, English language
  - Block D16: Mathematics, Geography, German language
  - Block D17: Mathematics, Geography, Russian language
  - Block D18: Mathematics, Geography, Japanese language
  - Block D19: Mathematics, Geography, French language
  - Block D20: Mathematics, Geography, Chinese language
  - Block D21: Mathematics, Chemistry, German language
  - Block D22: Mathematics, Chemistry, Russian language
  - Block D23: Mathematics, Chemistry, Japanese language
  - Block D24: Mathematics, Chemistry, French language
  - Block D25: Mathematics, Chemistry, Chinese language
  - Block D26: Mathematics, Physics, German language
  - Block D27: Mathematics, Physics, Russian language
  - Block D28: Mathematics, Physics, Japanese language
  - Block D29: Mathematics, Physics, French language
  - Block D30: Mathematics, Physics, Chinese language
  - Block D31: Mathematics, Biology, German language
  - Block D32: Mathematics, Biology, Russian language
  - Block D33: Mathematics, Biology, Japanese language
  - Block D34: Mathematics, Biology, French language
  - Block D35: Mathematics, Biology, Chinese language
  - Block D41: Literature, Geography, German language
  - Block D42: Literature, Geography, Russian language
  - Block D43: Literature, Geography, Japanese language
  - Block D44: Literature, Geography, French language
  - Block D45: Literature, Geography, Chinese language
  - Block D52: Literature, Physics, Russian language
  - Block D54: Literature, Physics, French language
  - Block D55: Literature, Physics, Chinese language
  - Block D61: Literature, History, German language
  - Block D62: Literature, History, Russian language
  - Block D63: Literature, History, Japanese language
  - Block D64: Literature, History, French language
  - Block D65: Literature, History, Chinese language
  - Block D66: Literature, Citizenship education, English language
  - Block D68: Literature, Citizenship education, Russian language
  - Block D69: Literature, Citizenship education, Japanese language
  - Block D70: Literature, Citizenship education, French language
  - Block D72: Literature, Natural science, English language
  - Block D73: Literature, Natural science, German language
  - Block D74: Literature, Natural science, Russian language
  - Block D75: Literature, Natural science, Japanese language
  - Block D76: Literature, Natural science, French language
  - Block D77: Literature, Natural science, Chinese language
  - Block D78: Literature, Social science, English language
  - Block D79: Literature, Social science, German language
  - Block D80: Literature, Social science, Russian language
  - Block D81: Literature, Social science, Japanese language
  - Block D82: Literature, Social science, French language
  - Block D83: Literature, Social science, Chinese language
  - Block D84: Mathematics, Citizenship education, English language
  - Block D85: Mathematics, Citizenship education, German language
  - Block D86: Mathematics, Citizenship education, Russian language
  - Block D87: Mathematics, Citizenship education, French language
  - Block D88: Mathematics, Citizenship education, Japanese language
  - Block D90: Mathematics, Natural science, English language
  - Block D91: Mathematics, Natural science, French language
  - Block D92: Mathematics, Natural science, German language
  - Block D93: Mathematics, Natural science, Russian language
  - Block D94: Mathematics, Natural science, Japanese language
  - Block D95: Mathematics, Natural science, Chinese language
  - Block D96: Mathematics, Social science, English language
  - Block D97: Mathematics, Social science, French language
  - Block D98: Mathematics, Social science, German language
  - Block D99: Mathematics, Social science, Russian language
  - Block DD0: Mathematics, Social science, Japanese language
  - Block DD2: Literature, Mathematics, Korean language
  - Block DH1: Literature, Geography, Korean language

Gifted blocks:

- Block H: Literature, Fine art
  - Block H00: Literature, Fine art 1 (Figure drawing), Fine art 2 (Illustration)
  - Block H01: Mathematics, Literature, Fine art
  - Block H02: Mathematics, Fine art 1 (Figure drawing), Fine art 2 (Illustration)
  - Block H03: Mathematics, Natural science, Fine art
  - Block H04: Mathematics, English language, Fine art
  - Block H05: Literature, Social science, Fine art
  - Block H06: Literature, English language, Fine art
  - Block H07: Mathematics, Fine art, Decorative arts
  - Block H08: Literature, History, Fine art
- Block K (for volcational education graduates that seek higher education in university): Mathematics, Physics, Specialized Major
- Block M: Literature, Mathematics, Expressive storytelling, Singing
  - Block M00: Literature, Mathematics, Expressive reading, Singing
  - Block M01: Literature, History, Talent
  - Block M02: Mathematics, Talent 1 (Singing, Storytelling), Talent 2 (Expressive reading)
  - Block M03: Literature, Talent 1 (Singing, Storytelling), Talent 2 (Expressive reading)
  - Block M04: Mathematics, Talent 2 (Expressive reading), Singing - Dance
  - Block M10: Mathematics, English language, Talent 1 (Singing, Storytelling)
  - Block M13: Mathematics, Biology, Talent
  - Block M14: Literature, Journalism, Mathematics
  - Block M15: Literature, Journalism, English language
  - Block M16: Literature, Journalism, Physics
  - Block M17: Literature, Journalism, History
  - Block M18: Literature, Photography, Mathematics
  - Block M19: Literature, Photography, English language
  - Block M20: Literature, Photography, Physics
  - Block M21: Literature, Photography, History
  - Block M22: Literature, Videography, Mathematics
  - Block M23: Literature, Videography, English language
  - Block M24: Literature, Videography, Physics
  - Block M25: Literature, Videography, History
- Block N: Literature, Music
  - Block N00: Literature, Musical talent 1 (Singing, Solfège), Musical talent 2 (Perfect pitch)
  - Block N01: Literature, Solfège, Performing arts
  - Block N02: Literature, Solfège, Singing or Playing musical instrument
  - Block N04: Literature, Presentational skills, Talent
  - Block N05: Literature, Event management skills, Talent
  - Block N08: Literature, Chord progression, Lyric poetry
  - Block N09: Literature, Chord progression, Conducting
- Block R: Literature, History, Journalism
  - Block R00: Literature, History, Journalism
  - Block R01: Literature, Geography, Performing arts
  - Block R01: Literature, Mathematics, Performing arts
  - Block R01: Literature, English language, Performing arts
  - Block R01: Literature, Performing arts, Sociology
  - Block R01: Literature, English language, Media studies
- Block S: Literature, Theatre Arts
  - Block S00: Literature, Theatre Arts 1, Theatre Arts 2
  - Block S01: Mathematics, Theatre Arts 1, Theatre Arts 2
- Block T: Mathematics, Biology, Sports
- Block V: Mathematics, Physics, Fine art

Each subject is graded on a 10-mark scale.

== Form ==
Prior to 2001, each institution conducted its own entrance exams under the supervision of the Ministry of Education. Accordingly, candidates who registered for the exams at many schools must go through each school's exams. Since 2001, the Ministry of Education has begun to conduct a single exam, and the results would be applied to all schools that candidates have registered.

Since 2007, the form of objective test applied to the four subjects: physics, chemistry, biology and foreign languages; four subjects: mathematics, literature, history and geography are in essay format.

== See also ==
- High School Graduation Examination
