= MIT University Vietnam =

Private university in Vietnam

Coordinates: 10°56′40″N 107°09′39″E

- Motto: Sáng tạo - Hội nhập - Tư duy khởi nghiệp - tinh thần học tập suốt đời
- Motto in English: Creativity - Integration - Entrepreneurial thinking - lifelong learning spirit
- Type: Private university
- Established: November 11, 2013
- Location: Thong Nhat District, Đồng Nai province, Vietnam
- Website: https://mit.vn/

MIT University Vietnam is a private multidisciplinary university in Vietnam, established on November 11, 2013 under Decision No. 2168/QD-TTg of the Prime Minister of Vietnam, under the educational management of the Vietnamese Ministry of Education and Training. The school is located at National Highway 1A, Tran Hung Dao Quarter, Dau Giay Town, Thong Nhat District, Dong Nai Province, is the central area of the economic quadrangle of Ba Ria-Vung Tau - Binh Duong - Dong Nai - Ho Chi Minh City, with many satellite industrial parks, easily connected to medical, tourism and commercial systems thanks to favorable traffic conditions.

== Formation and development process ==
MIT University Vietnam was established on November 11, 2013 under Decision No. 2168/QD-TTg of the Prime Minister of Vietnam and put into operation under Decision No. 727/QD-BGDDT of the Vietnamese Ministry of Education and Training dated March 4, 2014. In 2014, the school officially went into operation and began its first enrollment season. In 2021, the school joined Nguyen Hoang Education Group (NHG) - one of the largest private education groups in Vietnam. Along with that, the school changed its name to MIT University Vietnam.

In 2014, the school officially came into operation and began its first enrollment season. In 2015: The school expanded its training scale with many new majors, while focusing on investing in facilities such as dormitories, soccer fields, and outdoor sports areas to improve the quality of student services. In 2016, the school was honored to receive a Certificate of Merit from the Chairman of the Dong Nai Provincial People's Committee, recognizing the tireless efforts of the school's lecturers and staff in the process of construction and development. By 2017, many groups and individuals of the school continued to be awarded certificates of merit by the Dong Nai Provincial People's Committee for their positive contributions to education and local development. In 2018, the school held its first Graduation Ceremony for more than 800 students of the 2014-2018 course, marking an important milestone in the journey of training quality human resources. In 2019, the school achieved many outstanding achievements in the patriotic emulation movement and was recognized at the provincial and industry levels. By 2020, the school was recognized as meeting educational quality accreditation standards, affirming the quality of training and quality assurance activities of the School. In 2021, the school officially joined Nguyen Hoang Education Group (NHG) - one of the largest private education groups in Vietnam. Along with that, the school changed its name to MIT University Vietnam, marking a major turning point in its comprehensive development strategy and international integration. In 2022, the school continued to upgrade and expand its facilities, expand its learning, research and living spaces to meet the increasing needs of students. In 2023, Deputy Minister of Health of Vietnam Nguyen Thi Lien Huong signed a decision on assigning the task of training level I specialists to the Eastern University of Technology, specializing in Pharmaceutical Organization and Management. The school officially launched the training of Specialized I. At the same time, MIT University Vietnam officially opened the Master's program in Economic Law, affirming the development to a new height in postgraduate training. In 2024, Deputy Minister of Education and Training Hoang Minh Son signed a decision to allow Eastern University of Technology to train master's degrees in Pharmacology and Clinical Pharmacy. The school officially launched the Master's training in the Health sector. In 2025, the school officially expanded its international scale by collaborating with Tunku Abdul Rahman University of Management and Technology (TAR UMT) in Malaysia, bringing the first batch of MIT students to experience the world.

== Curriculum ==
MIT University Vietnam has 26 regular training majors, including 4 key majors and 14 majors applying emerging technology. MIT University Vietnam's training program emphasizes the combination of in-depth professional knowledge and the application of technology in learning, ensuring that students will be equipped with the necessary skills and knowledge.

MIT University Vietnam's full-time undergraduate program is taught and trained by a faculty that combines theoretical knowledge and practical experience. Their graduate employment rate is 98.2%.

- Information Technology
- Graphic Design (Specializations: Graphic Design, Interior Design)
- Automotive Engineering Technology (Specializations: Automotive Engineering Technology, Electric and Smart Vehicles)
- Control and Automation Engineering Technology
- Electrical and Electronic Engineering Technology (Specialization: Industrial Electrical Engineering)
- Digital Marketing
- Accounting
- Transport Economics
- Logistics and Supply Chain Management
- Economic Law
- Industrial Management
- Tourism and Travel Services Management
- Business Administration (Specializations: Business Administration, Aviation Service Management)
- Finance and Banking
- Multimedia Communications
- E-Commerce
- English Language
- Korean Language
- Japanese Language
- Chinese Language
- Veterinary Medicine
- Pharmacy
- Medicine
- Nursing
- Odonto-Stomatology (Dentistry)
- Medical Laboratory Technology

== Facilities ==
The school has 4 faculties, 2 institutes, 8 departments and 3 centers, training a total of 26 majors and focusing on high technology and innovation. Some majors will receive key investment such as Automotive Engineering Technology, Aviation Engineering, Logistics and Supply Chain Management, Data Science and Artificial Intelligence, Pharmacy, etc. Facilities include laboratories, practice workshops, multi-purpose gymnasiums, artificial football fields, dormitories with a capacity of more than 1,300 seats.

The new university model that will be applied is the smart university model with smart classrooms, a smart learning environment, smart lecturers, smart campuses, smart learning communities, and smart learning methods.

With a total floor area of over 24 hectares, enough capacity for over 20,000 students, MIT University is confident to be one of the universities with the most modern and large-scale facilities in the region. MIT University also owns a modern facility system to best serve the learning and research of students. Classrooms are fully equipped with modern equipment, laboratories, practice workshops, multi-purpose gymnasiums and artificial football fields, creating favorable conditions for students to practice, research and develop necessary skills. In particular, the pharmacy laboratories and practice workshops serve automotive engineering technology and are a highlight of the school. With an investment of nearly 90 billion VND, the auto practice workshop is equipped with modern equipment, combined with virtual reality technology, helping students to proactively self-study, self-research and innovate.
