= MICA Institute =

MICA: Multimedia, Information, Communication & Applications
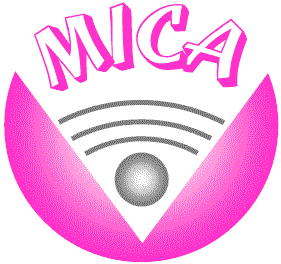
- Type: International research institute
- Established: 2002
- Location: Hanoi, Vietnam
- Campus: Hanoi University of Science and Technology
- Website: http://www.mica.edu.vn

MICA: Multimedia, Information, Communication & Applications is an international research institute affiliated to the Hanoi University of Science and Technology in Vietnam.

== Aims ==
Its purpose is to contribute to the development of information technology in Vietnam.

== Affiliations ==
MICA is affiliated to the Hanoi University of Science and Technology, to the French Centre National de la Recherche Scientifique, and to the Grenoble Institute of Technology (Grenoble-INP).

== History ==
MICA was officially created in 2002. The project of founding a high-level research centre in communication technology in Hanoi dates back to several years earlier. This project was realized through the implication of Vietnamese and French government institutions, and of the two universities to which MICA is affiliated.

In 2006, MICA was granted the status of Unité Mixte Internationale (UMI) by CNRS.

In 2011, MICA acquired the status of Institute within the Hanoi University of Science and Technology. Since then, its full name has been "International Research Institute MICA, HUST – CNRS/UMI-2954 – Grenoble INP, Hanoi University of Science and Technology."

CNRS participation in the MICA Institute was eventually discontinued: in 2021, when the earlier Unité Mixte Internationale (UMI) system was transformed into a new system of International Research Laboratories (IRLs), MICA was not found among the list set up by CNRS. The Institute's activities continue as an in-house Institute within the Hanoi University of Science and Technology.

== Organization ==
The MICA Institute consists of

- three research departments
  - Speech Communication
  - Computer Vision
  - Pervasive Spaces and Interaction
- a centre for Technological Transfer and Applications
- scientific and technological platforms

== Sample of research projects ==
=== Speech communication ===
- APPSy (Asymétries Phonétique et Phonologique de la Syllabe, i.e., Phonetic and Phonological Asymmetries in the Syllable), funded by Agence nationale de la recherche. In partnership with GIPSA-lab, LIDILEM, LIG, LPP and Phonolab-ULB/LSP (Belgium). Aim: to explore the links between mandibular gestures and syllabic structures, on the basis of a sample of languages with widely different syllable types and consonantal inventories: Tashlhiyt Berber, French, Polish, Brazilian Portuguese, Kinyarwanda, Ruwund, and Vietnamese.
- AuCo (Audio Corpora). Aim: to put together an open-access collection of recordings of languages of Vietnam and neighbouring countries. In partnership with the Pangloss Collection (CNRS-LACITO) and SLDR (CNRS-LPL). AuCo stands for AudioCorpora; it is also a reference to Âu Cơ, a fairy who is mother to the Hundred Peoples (Bách Việt), ancestor to the Vietnamese and to the multitude of other ethnic groups of the area. The project logo (deposited on Wikimedia Commons) is:

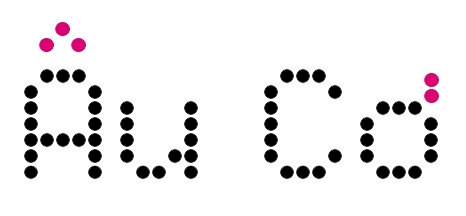

=== Pervasive spaces ===
- VIPPA (Visually Impaired People Assistance using multimodal technologies). Aim: providing a framework for aiding blind pupils in their collective life in a school campus to navigate with safety in indoor and outdoor environments and to improve their perception about contextual information. Project conducted within the framework of the Vietnam-Belgium programme VLIR, in partnership with IMEP-LAHC (France), LIG/PRIMA (France), Image Processing and Interpretation Research Groupe, Ghent University (Belgium), and Danang University (Vietnam).
- SYSAPA (Système de surveillance pour l'assistance des personnes aveugles en environnement perceptifs). Project conducted in the framework of the Vietnamese-French programme Hoa Sen/Lotus, in partnership with IMEP-LAHC.

=== Multimedia ===
- ICT-PAMM (Personal Assistance for Mobility and Manipulation). Project conducted in the framework of the 2010/2011 STIC-ASIE programme, in partnership with INRIA, LASMEA, Sungkyunhkwan University (Korea), NTU (Taiwan), and Kumamoto University (Japan).
