= College entrance exam =

College entrance exam may refer to any standardized test which is needed in order for one to be considered eligible for application by a post-secondary institution, such as:

- SAT Reasoning Test, in the United States
- ACT, also in the United States
- CLT, also in the United States
- The Hong Kong Diploma of Secondary Education, in Hong Kong
- Panhellenic Examinations Notorious exam-based "one-shot" system widely considered Europe’s most difficult and psychologically taxing university entrance marathon.
- Leaving Certificate, the university matriculation examination in Ireland.
- Baccalauréat, the academic qualification examination in France
- ATAR, the academic qualification examination in Australia (Note: Different states and territories have different external standardised tests.: New South Wales: Higher School Certificate (HSC); Victoria: Victorian Certificate of Education (VCE); Queensland: Queensland Certificate of Education (QCE), Queensland Certificate of Individual Achievement (QCIA); South Australia: South Australian Certificate of Education (SACE); Western Australia: Western Australian Certificate of Education (WACE); Tasmania: Tasmanian Certificate of Education (TCE); ACT: No external standardised exams; Northern Territory: Northern Territory Certificate of Education and Training (NTCET))
- Abitur, the academic qualification examination in Germany
- GCSE, in England, Wales and Northern Ireland
- IGCSE, administered by Cambridge International Examinations
- OSS (Student Selection and Placement System), the academic qualification and ranking exam in Turkey, where more than 1.7 million students take each year
- Matura, the academic qualification examination in Albania, Austria, Bosnia and Herzegovina, Bulgaria, Croatia, the Czech Republic, Hungary, Italy, Liechtenstein, Lithuania, Macedonia, Montenegro, Poland, Serbia, Slovakia, Slovenia and Switzerland
- TS ĐH-CĐ, in Vietnam
- Selectividad, in Spain
- University Entrance Exam commonly known as Konkour, in Iran
- CSAT(수능), in South Korea.
- GSAT(學測) and AST(分科測驗) - in Taiwan
- Gaokao National College Entrance Examination, in China.
- National Center Test for University Admissions, in Japan
- SBMPTN, a competitive exam required to enroll in public universities in Indonesia.
- PSU Prueba de Selección Universitaria, in Chile
- ENEM Exame Nacional do Ensino Médio, in Brazil
- ICFES Examen ICFES Prueba Saber 11, in Colombia
- Riigieksamid — in Estonia.
- Unified State Exam – in Russia.
- External independent testing - in Ukraine.
- Unified National Testing - in Kazakhstan.
- General Republican Testing - in Kyrgyzstan.
- Centralized Testing - in Belarus, Latvia and Tajikistan
- Unified State/National Exams - in Armenia and Georgia
- Bacalaureat - in Moldova and Romania

== See also ==
- Matriculation exam
