= Trưng Vương Junior Secondary School, Nha Trang =

Coordinates: 12.2543°N 109.1899°E

Trung Vuong Junior High School
- Trường Phổ thông Cơ sở Trưng Vương

Location
- 12 Ly Quoc Su Street; Van Thanh; Nha Trang, Khanh Hoa; Vietnam

Information
- School type: Junior High School
- Established: 1933
- Founder: Tran-Xuong-Sam (陳昌森), Phan-Tien-Cam (潘先錦) and Dang-Lap (鄧立)

Trưng Vương was a junior high school in Nha Trang, Vietnam. This former school's academic program was accredited by the Republic of China and the Republic of Vietnam. Before 1975, it was known more Khaiminh, Khải Minh Nha Trang, or "Trường Tàu", because this school was built by overseas Chinese to supply Vietnamese - Chinese learning programs for their children.

== History ==
The development of Chinese groups in Nha Trang demanded an education for their children to keep the Chinese culture. In 1933, they joined capital to buy a 3500m^{2} area at North Nhatrang to build a small school named "Nha Trang Công lập Hoa kiều Học giáo" (Chinese:芽莊公立華僑學校). The formers are Tran-Xuong-Sam (陳昌森), Phan-Tien-Cam (潘先錦) and Dang-Lap (鄧立). Tran-Xuong-Sam was the first principal.

In 1939, Mandarin Chinese textbooks with Republic of China's standards was used.

During World War II, it was delayed, devastated and occupied by Japanese forces. When French recaptured Nha Trang, the school was reopened and renamed "Hoa kiều Công lập Trung Hoa Học giáo" (Overseas Chinese Public School) (华侨 公立 中华 学校) to avoid the influence of the French - Vietnam conflicts. Su-Cam-Ba (史锦波) was appointed to be the principal.

In 1959, Republic of Vietnam's department of Education forced it to rename "Trường Khải Minh Nha Trang" (芽莊啟明學校, Nha Trang Khaiminh School) to avoid the word "Chinese".

Later 1975, it was requisitioned by new regime for using as a basis public education. Two years later, the school is named Khai Minh and taught 2 periods of Chinese weekly. However, due to problems of Sino-Vietnamese War and Boat people, the school was renamed "Trường Phổ thông Cơ sở Vạn Thạnh 2" (the 2nd Van Thanh Junior School), and no longer focusing original Chinese students.

By August 1995, it was Kim-Dong Primary School. An 8 years later, from August 2003 to this day, the school was Trung Vuong junior high school.

== Related Sites ==
- http://www.binhhoa-ninhhoa.org/
