= Ministry of Science and Technology (Vietnam) =

Government ministry of Vietnam

Socialist Republic of Vietnam Ministry of Science and Technology
- Bộ Khoa học và Công nghệ
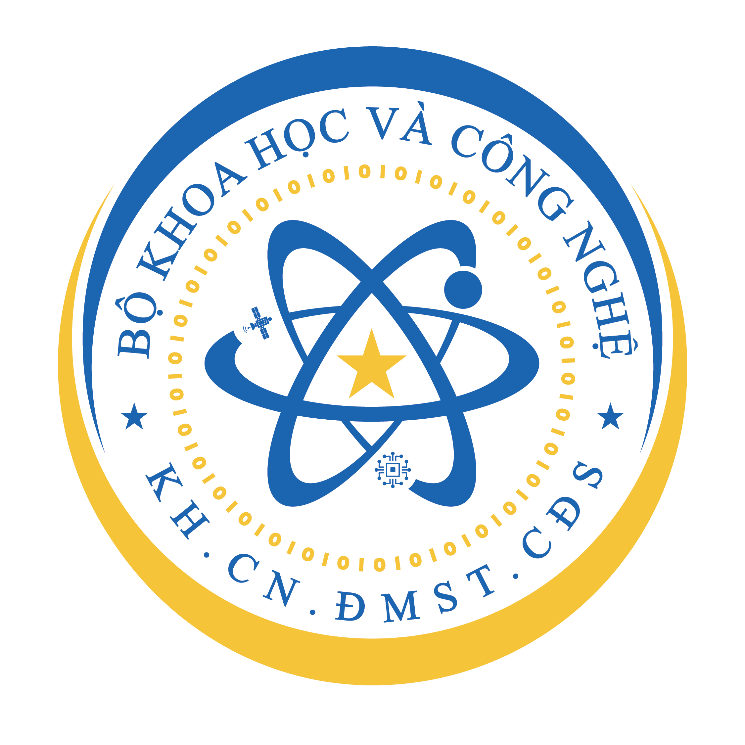

Ministry overview
- Formed: 4 March 1959
- Preceding Ministry: State Committee of Science (1959-1965) State Committee of Science and Engineering (1965-1990) State Committee of Science (1990-1992) Ministry of Science, Technology and Environment (1992-2002) Ministry of Science and Technology (2002-)
- Type: Government Ministry
- Jurisdiction: Government of Vietnam
- Headquarters: 18 Nguyễn Du, Cửa Nam Ward, Hanoi
- Annual budget: 3.174 billions VND (2018)
- Minister responsible: Vũ Hải Quân
- Deputy Minister responsible: Lê Xuân Định Hoàng Minh Phạm Đức Long Trần Trung Tính
- Website: mst.gov.vn

The Ministry of Science and Technology (MOST; Vietnamese: Bộ Khoa học và Công nghệ) is a government ministry in Vietnam responsible for state administration of science and technology activities; development of science and technology potentials; intellectual property; standards, metrology and quality control; atomic energy, radiation and nuclear safety.

== Ministers ==
The Minister of Science and Technology of Vietnam is the head of the Ministry of Science and Technology.

#	Minister of Science and Technology	Term		Position
#	Minister of Science and Technology	Begin	End	Position
State Science Commission (1958–1965)
1	Trường Chinh (1907–1988)	14 December 1958	15 July 1960	Deputy Prime Minister; Chairman of the State Science Commission
2	Võ Nguyên Giáp (1911–2013)	15 July 1960	7 January 1963	Deputy Prime Minister; Chairman of the State Science Commission
3	Nguyễn Duy Trinh (1910–1985)	7 January 1963	11 October 1965	Deputy Prime Minister; Chairman of the State Science Commission
Chairman of the State Committee for Science and Technology (1965–1992)
4	Trần Đại Nghĩa (1913–1997)	11 October 1965	28 February 1977	Chairman of the State Committee for Science and Technology
5	Trần Quỳnh (1920–2005)	28 February 1977	7 February 1980	Chairman of the State Committee for Science and Technology
-	Lê Khắc (1916–1990)	7 February 1980	4 July 1981	Chairman of the State Committee for Science and Technology
6	Lê Khắc (1916–1990)	4 July 1981	23 April 1982	Chairman of the State Committee for Science and Technology
7	Đặng Hữu (Born 1930)	23 April 1982	12 March 1990	Chairman of the State Committee for Science and Technology
State Science Commission (1990–1992)
(7)	Đặng Hữu (Born 1930)	12 March 1990	12 October 1992	Chairman of the State Science Commission
Ministry of Science, Technology and Environment (1992–2002)
(7)	Đặng Hữu (Born 1930)	12 October 1992	6 November 1996	Minister of Science, Technology and Environment
8	Phạm Gia Khiêm (Born 1944)	6 November 1996	29 September 1997	Minister of Science, Technology and Environment
9	Chu Tuấn Nhạ (Born 1939)	3 August 2011	8 April 2016	Minister of Science, Technology and Environment
Ministry of Science and Technology (2002–)
10	Hoàng Văn Phong (Born 1948)	8 August 2002	1 August 2011	Minister of Science and Technology
11	Nguyễn Quân (Born 1955)	3 August 2011	8 April 2016	Minister of Science and Technology
12	Chu Ngọc Anh (Born 1965)	9 April 2016	12 November 2020	Minister of Science and Technology
13	Huỳnh Thành Đạt (Born 1962)	12 November 2020	18 February 2025	Minister of Science and Technology
14	Nguyễn Mạnh Hùng (Born 1962)	1 March 2025	8 April 2026	Minister of Science and Technology
15	Vũ Hải Quân (Born 1974)	8 April 2026	Incumbent	Minister of Science and Technology
