= Hanoi University of Science and Technology =

University in Hanoi, Vietnam

- Đại học Bách khoa Hà Nội
- Former names: Polytechnic University (Vietnamese: Đại học Chuyên nghiệp Bách khoa); Hanoi University of Technology (HUT) (-2010)
- Motto: Một tình yêu, Một tương lai
- Motto in English: One Love, One Future
- Type: Technical university (Public); Polytechnic
- Established: October 15, 1956
- President: Lê Anh Tuấn
- Vice-president: Huỳnh Quyết Thắng; Nguyễn Phong Điền; Huỳnh Đăng Chính; Trần Ngọc Khiêm; Vũ Văn Yêm; Tạ Hải Tùng
- Faculty: 1,250 (2023)
- Administrative staff: 450 (2023)
- Students: 38,015 (2023)
- Undergraduates: 36,450 (2023)
- Postgraduates: 1,405 (2023)
- Location: 1 Đại Cồ Việt Bạch Mai Ward, Hanoi, Vietnam; 21°00′23″N 105°50′35″E
- Campus: 26 ha Urban
- Colors: Red and Yellow
- Website: www.hust.edu.vn
- Location within Vietnam

The Hanoi University of Science and Technology (HUST; Vietnamese: Đại học Bách khoa Hà Nội, lit. 'Hanoi Polytechnic', formerly known in English as Hanoi University of Technology (HUT) until 2010) is the first and largest technical university in Vietnam. In May 2010 its name in English was changed to Hanoi University of Science and Technology (abbreviated HUST), this was made with the goal to promote research and training alongside the university's purpose besides technology transfer. The name in Vietnamese and French remain the same — Đại học Bách khoa Hà Nội and Institut Polytechnique de Hanoi respectively. HUST is a multidisciplinary technical university.

== Academics ==
=== Schools, departments, and faculties ===
- School of Information and Communication Technology
- School of Material Science and Engineering
- School of Mechanical Engineering
- School of Economics and Management
- School of Electronics and Electrical Engineering
- School of Chemical and Life Science
- Faculty of Mathematics and Informatics
- Faculty of Engineering Physics
- Faculty of Education Science and Technology
- Faculty of Foreign Languages
- Faculty of Political Theory
- Faculty of Physical Education
- Faculty of National Defense & Security Education
- Center for Continual Education

=== Institutes and research centers ===
- Institute of Biological and Food Technology (IBFT)
- Institute of Engineering Physics (INEP)
- Institute for Environment Science and Technology (INEST)
- Institute of Heat Engineering and Refrigeration (IHERE)
- International Training Institute For Materials Science (ITIMS)
- Automation Research Center (ARC)
- Bach Khoa Computer Security Center (BKCS)
- The International Research Center for AI (BKAI)
- Biomedical Electronics Center
- Center for Development and Application of Software for Industry (DASI)
- Center for Education and Development of Chromatography
- Center for High Performance Computing (HPC)
- Center for Research and Development of High Technology
- Center for Research and Consulting on Management
- Center for Talents Training
- Center for Technology Innovation (CTI)
- Corrosion and Protection Research Center
- Inorganic Materials Research Center
- "Multimedia Information, Communication and Applications" (MICA) Institute
- International Training Programme and Centers
- KITECH-HUT Center
- Library and Information Network Center (LINC)
- Materials Science Center
- Polymer Center
- Polytechnology Company
- Precise Machinery Research Center
- Renewable Energy Research center (RERC)

== Alumni ==
- Phan Thu: Lieutenant General, Hero of the People's Armed Forces, former Deputy Minister of National Defence.
- Vũ Đình Cự: former Vice Chairman of the National Assembly, first-round Ho Chi Minh Prize in science and engineering.
- Hoàng Trung Hải: former member of the Politburo, former Secretary of the Hanoi Party Committee, former Minister of Industry, former Deputy Prime Minister of the Vietnamese Government.
- Phạm Gia Khiêm: former Deputy Prime Minister and Minister of Foreign Affairs.
- Vũ Xuân Thiều: Pilot who shot down a B-52 bomber in 1972.
- Hoàng Văn Nghiên: former Chairman of Hanoi People's Committee.
- Hoàng Văn Phong: former Minister of Science and Technology.
- Nguyễn Minh Hiển: former Minister of Education and Training.
- Nguyễn Tiến Sâm: Hero of the People's Armed Forces, pilot of the Vietnam People's Army; former Deputy Minister of Transport, former Director of the Civil Aviation Authority of Vietnam.
- Nguyễn Quân: Former Minister of Science and Technology, former lecturer, former acting Vice Rector of the university.
- Tào Đức Thắng: General of People's Army of Vietnam; Chairman of Viettel Corporation.
- Hoàng Nam Tiến: former Chairman of FPT Software.
- Lê Mạnh Hùng: CEO of Petrovietnam.
- Trần Mạnh Hùng: former Chairman of VNPT.
- Dr. Mai Thanh Phong: Professor, President of Ho Chi Minh City University of Technology.
- Nguyễn Hà Đông: Developer of the famous game Flappy Bird.

== Presidents ==
- Trần Đại Nghĩa, 1956, former Deputy Minister of Industry and Commerce (1950–1960), former Minister of Heavy Industry (1960–1962), former chairman of the State Committee on Science and Technology for Vietnam (1965)
- Tạ Quang Bửu, 1956–1960, former Minister of Ministry of Defense (1947–1948), former Minister of Ministry of university and Secondary Education (1965–1976)
- Hoàng Xuân Tùy, 1961–1966, former Deputy Minister of Ministry of university and Secondary Education
- Phạm Đồng Điện, 7/1966–3/1980
- Hà Học Trạc, 3/1980–12/1989
- Hoàng Trọng Yêm, 12/1989–10/1994
- Nguyễn Minh Hiển, 10/1994–4/1997, former Minister of Ministry of Education and Training (6/1997–6/2006)
- Hoàng Văn Phong, 5/1997–11/2002, former Minister of Ministry of Science and Technology (8/2000–8/2011)
- Trần Quốc Thắng, 12/2002–11/2004, former Deputy Minister of Ministry of Science and Technology (2004–10/2009)
- Hoàng Bá Chư, 12/2004–6/2008
- Nguyễn Trọng Giảng, 6/2008–10/2014
- Hoàng Minh Sơn, 7/2015–10/2020
- Huỳnh Quyết Thắng, 10/2020–05/2026
- Lê Anh Tuấn, 05/2026–

== Gallery ==
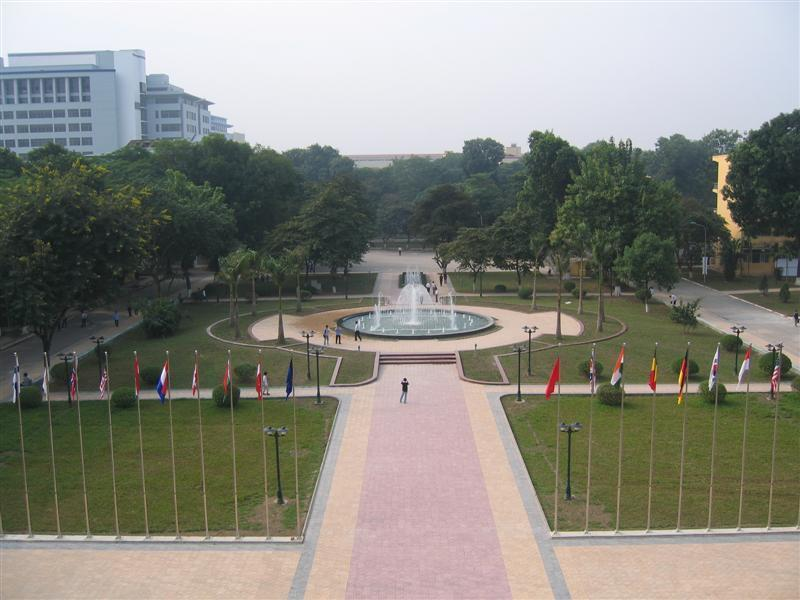
C1 main square

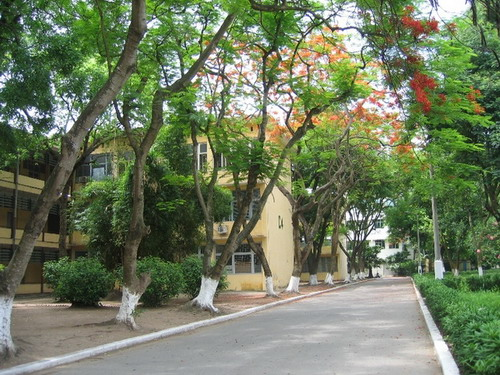
Tree-lined road

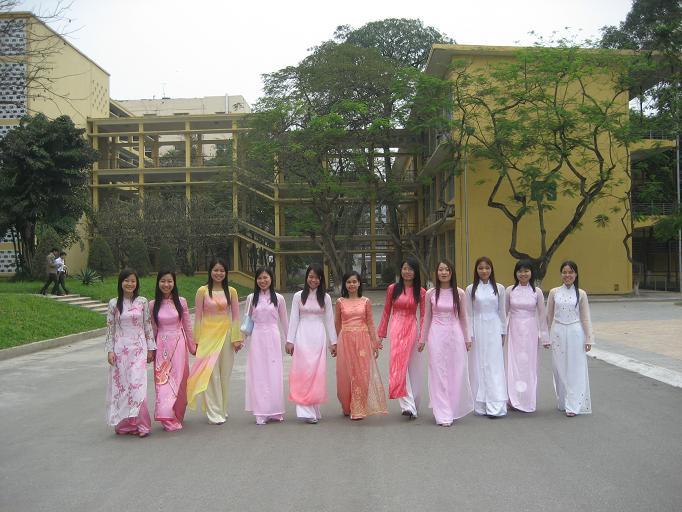
Students wearing áo dài, a form of dress
