= Trưng Vương Junior Secondary School, Hanoi =

Trưng Vương Junior Secondary School

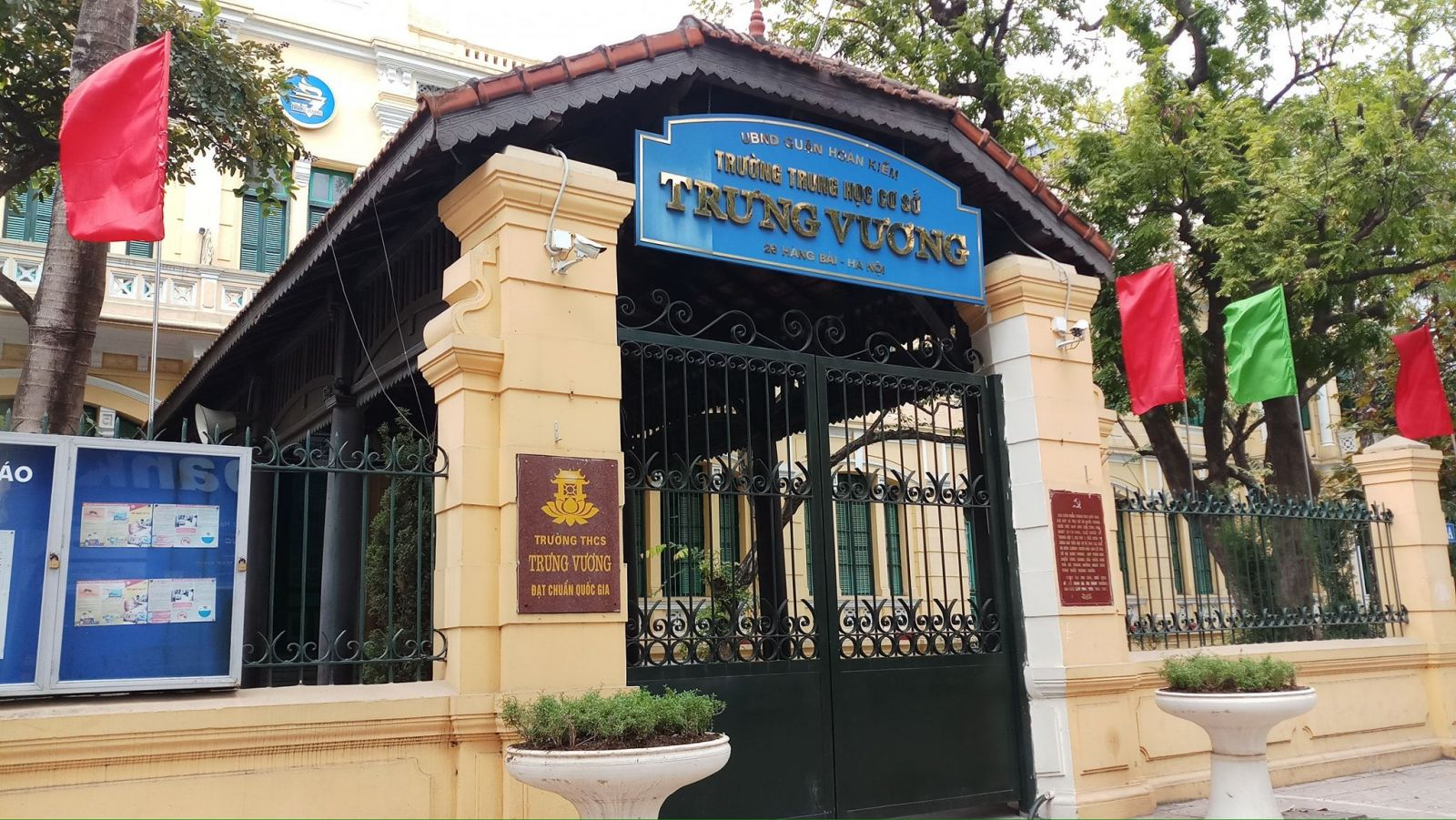

Location
- 26 Hang Bai Str., Hàng Bài, Hoàn Kiếm; Hanoi; Vietnam; 21°01′24″N 105°51′08″E

Information
- Type: Public junior secondary school
- Established: 1917
- Principal: Nguyễn Thị Thu Hà
- Grades: 6-9
- Enrollment: approx. 2,500
- Website: thcstrungvuong.hoankiem.edu.vn

Trưng Vương Junior Secondary School (Vietnamese: Trường Trung học cơ sở Trưng Vương) is a public junior secondary school in Hanoi, Vietnam. It was established in 1917 under the name Dong Khanh Girls' School.

== History ==
In 1917, the French authorities declared open the Annammite Girls' Institute (French: Institution de Jeunes Filles Annamites; Vietnamese: Trường Nữ học An Nam) in Hanoi. Initially, the institute was opened at a different address and only operated at the current address since 31 December 1925.

Because of changes in the education system, the institute changed its name to Annammite Girls' College (French: Collège de Jeunes Filles Annamites) in 1937. Due to the school's position being at a corner between Đồng Khánh and Carreau Boulevard, locals started calling it Đồng Khánh Girls' College (Vietnamese: Trường Nữ sinh Đồng Khánh).

=== During the First Indochina War ===
The school moved to Hưng Yên in 1943 likely to evade the War. After the August Revolution, it was moved back to Hoàng Mai, Hanoi in October 1945 obeying a decree from Minister Vũ Đình Hòe. On 14 February 1946, another decree was released, changing the school's name to Hai Bà Trưng Middle School. During tensions between forces in Hanoi, school buildings were used as headquarters for the Ministry of Defence in 1946. The 77th Battalion, a division of the Thăng Long Regiment (one of two regiments defending Hanoi, currently a part of the 320th Division) of the Army of the State of Vietnam had fought fiercefully with the French Armed Forces here. The school's current name has been used since 1948 and the campus moved back to 20 Hang Bai Street in 1956, after 13 years.

=== During the Vietnam War ===
In 1964, when United States Air Force was preparing to bomb North Vietnam, the school was temporarily relocated to Hà Tây until 1970.

In April 1972, under the threat of another US bombing operation on North Vietnam, the school was temporarily relocated to Hà Bắc until the Paris Peace Accords was signed.

== International relations ==
After the Đổi Mới reforms, the school has established connections with many international schools and organizations such as: Raffles High School (Singapore), Vibyskolan (Sweden), Charlemagne (France), Caterham (UK), KOICA Corporation (South Korea), Wodonga High School (Australia), Kaishi High School (Japan),...
