= Ho Chi Minh City University of Education =

University in Vietnam

Coordinates: 10.7866°N 106.6810°E

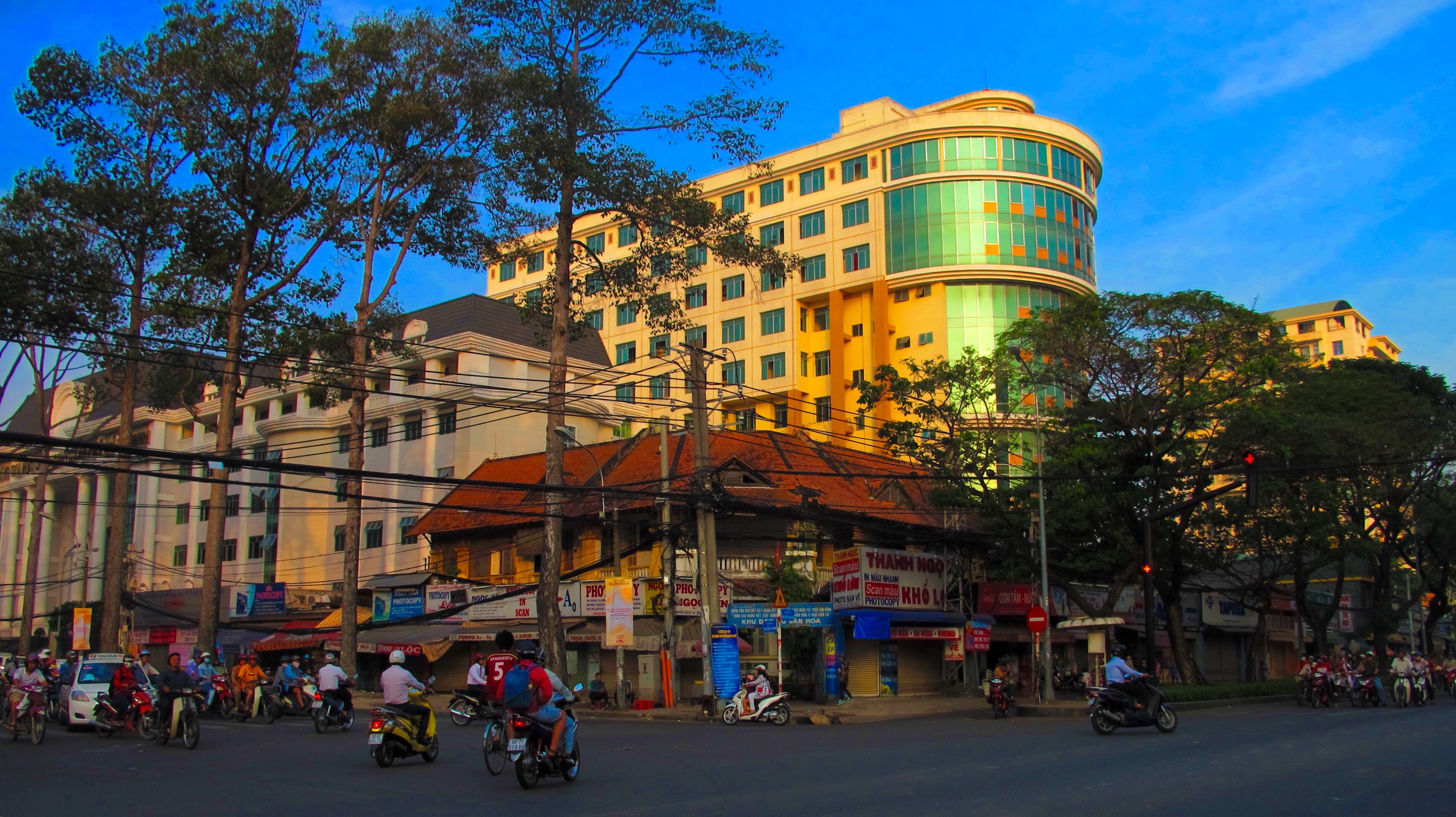
HCMC University of Education

Ho Chi Minh City University of Education (HCMUE, Vietnamese: Trường Đại học Sư phạm Thành phố Hồ Chí Minh) is a university specializing in tertiary-level training of teachers and lecturers located in Chợ Quán ward of Ho Chi Minh City.

The university is one of two largest pedagogical universities (with Hanoi National University of Education) in Vietnam and one of the 14 National Key Universities designated by the Government of Vietnam. In 2019 and 2020, it respectively ranked 1st and 2nd (after Hanoi National University of Education) in Vietnam for mathematics.

== History ==
1957: The predecessor institution is the Saigon University of Education. 27/10/1976: Ho Chi Minh City University of Education (HCMUE) was established under Decision No. 426/TTg by the Prime Minister. 1986: Received the Third-Class Labor Medal. 1995: Became a member of Vietnam National University, Ho Chi Minh City. 1996: The university was awarded the First-Class Labor Medal. 1999: The government decided to separate Ho Chi Minh City University of Education from the Vietnam National University to develop to be one of the National Key Universities of Education in the South. 2007: Received the Third-Class Independence Medal.

=== Educational philosopphy ===
- Ho Chi Minh City University of Education adheres to the educational philosophy aimed at training students to meet the following standards: becoming education practitioners that are professional, ethical, disciplined, responsible to the community and highly adaptable.
- The University fosters constructive educational environment that focus on learners. Educational activities are systematically and flexibly organized, ensuring the harmonious connection between training and practice-application, therefore gear towards social and professional adaptation. All individuals and organizations involved in the university's educational activities are committed to collaborating and supporting effective education.
- The University respects and considers the quality in education as its guiding principle. The University utilizes wide-ranging educational approaches and training methods that respect diversity, encourages the development of inner strength, positive thinking, soft skills and career enthusiasm.

=== Vision and mission ===
==== Core values ====
Quality - Creativity - Humanity
