= Ministry of Education and Training =

Government ministry of Vietnam

Socialist Republic of Vietnam Ministry of Education and Training
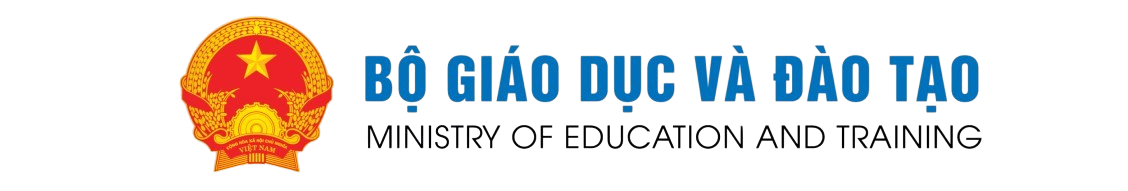

Ministry overview
- Formed: 28 August 1945
- Preceding agencies: Ministry of Education and Fine Arts (1907–1945); Ministry of National Education (1945–1946); Ministry of Education (1946–1990); Ministry of Tertiary and Professional Secondary Education (1965–1988); Ministry of Tertiary, Professional Secondary and Vocational Education (1988–1990); Ministry of Education and Training (1990–)
- Jurisdiction: Government of Vietnam
- Headquarters: 35 Đại Cồ Việt Street, Bạch Mai Ward, Hanoi
- Annual budget: 229.074 billions VND (2018)
- Minister responsible: Hoàng Minh Sơn
- Deputy Ministers responsible: Phạm Ngọc Thưởng; Lê Quân; Nguyễn Thị Quyên Thanh; Đoàn Trung Kiên; Phạm Quang Hưng
- Website: www.moet.gov.vn

The Ministry of Education and Training (MOET) is the government ministry responsible for the governance of general/academic education and higher education (training) in Vietnam.

== History ==
After the August Revolution, the Democratic Republic of Vietnam was created. The Ministry of National Education was established in the new administration, with Vũ Đình Hòe serving as the first Minister. On 2 March 1946, during the first session of the First National Assembly, the Ministry was renamed to the Ministry of Education. Đặng Thai Mai was appointed Minister of Education, succeeding Vũ Đình Hòe, who was appointed Minister of Justice. The government issued directives creating the Literacy Campaign Department to fight illiteracy. Along with combatting illiteracy, the Democratic Republic of Vietnam administration implemented reforms that formed the framework for the national education system.

In November 1946, during the second session of the First National Assembly, Nguyễn Văn Huyên was appointed Minister of National Education. The Ministry of National Education consisted of the Office of the Ministry and departments such as Higher Education, Secondary Education, Primary Education, and the Literacy Campaign Department. During the First Indochina War, the Ministry evacuated and relocated its offices from the capital to rural areas, moving from Hà Đông, Phú Thọ to Tuyên Quang and the Safe Zone. In 1950, the Central Committee of the Communist Party and the government decided to implement educational reform. This reform established a 9-year general education system and a new curriculum. This period also saw the establishment of the Vietnam Education Union (July 1951). During the First Indochina War, the education system, from general to higher education, was not only maintained and continuously developed but also transformed in quality. Schools from general education to universities all taught in Vietnamese. The 1950–1954 educational reform fundamentally changed the old colonial education system and laid the foundation for a new education system: national, scientific, and popular.

== Departments ==
The Ministry maintains provincial-level departments (DoETs, Departments of E&T), under which there are also district offices (BoETs, Bureau of E&T), and central departments. Central departments of note include:

- Science and Technology Activities in Education and Training
- Information and Communication Technology Centre
- National Institute for Education Strategy and Curriculum Development
- Education Publishing House
- Educational Equipment Company No. 1

== Universities ==
Colleges and universities under the maintenance of the Ministry of Education and Training include:

- Hanoi University of Science and Technology
- Ho Chi Minh City University of Education (or Ho Chi Minh City Pedagogical University)
- College of Social Labour
- College of Chemicals
- Ho Chi Minh City College of Marketing
- College of Mining Engineering
- Ho Chi Minh City Procuratorial College
- University of Trade Unions
- Institute of Journalism and Propaganda
- Hanoi University of Education No.2
- Hanoi National University of Education
- Quy Nhon University of Education
- Ho Chi Minh City Technical Teacher Training University
- Banking University, Ho Chi Minh City
- Hanoi Open University (HOU)
- Phuong Dong University
- Van Lang University (VLU)
- Hung Vuong University (HVU)
- Duy Tan University (DTU)
