= Word processor (electronic device) =

Electronic device

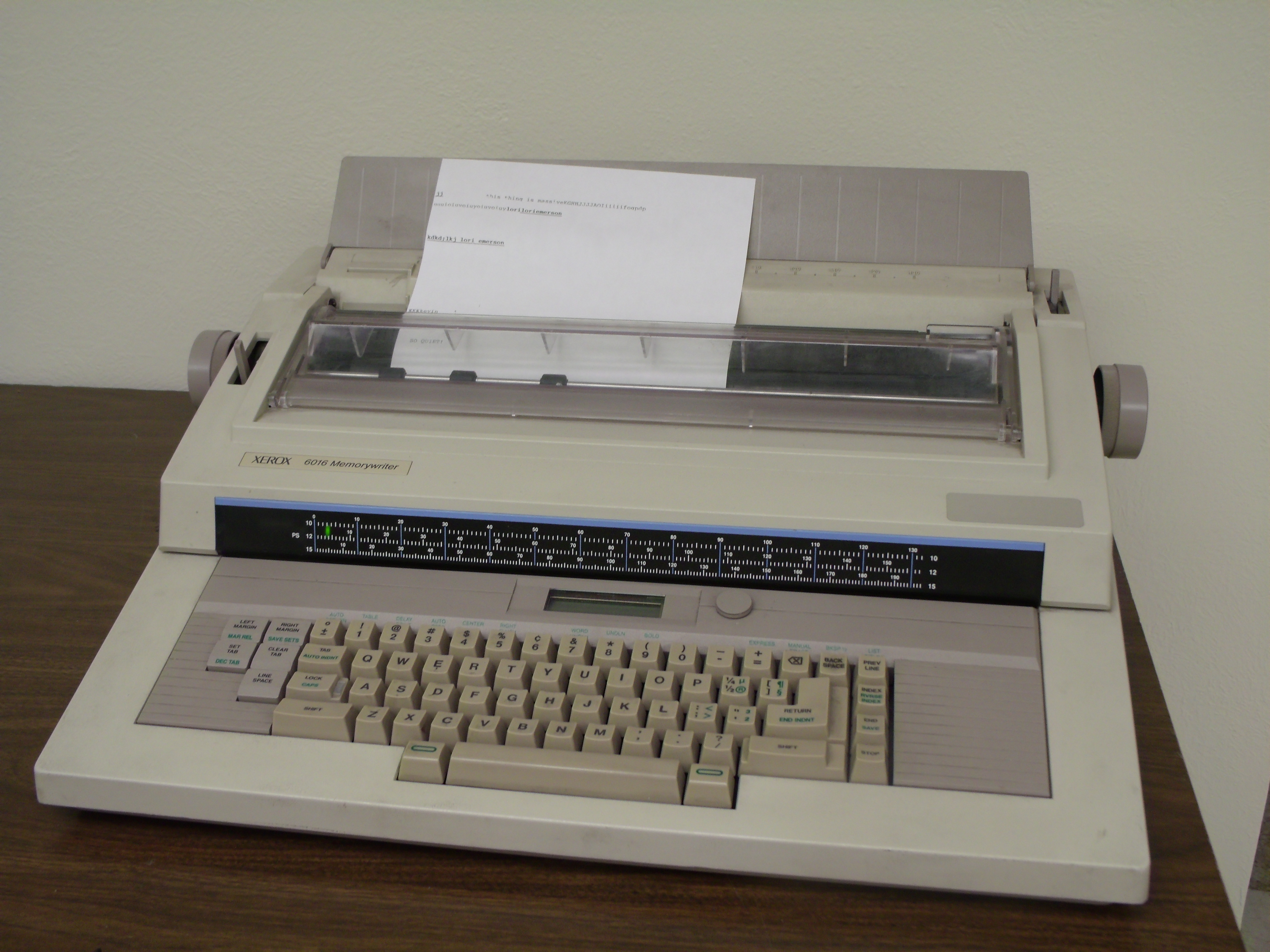
A Xerox 6016 Memorywriter Word Processor

A word processor is an electronic device (later a computer software application) for text, composing, editing, formatting, and printing.

The word processor was a stand-alone office machine developed in the 1960s, combining the keyboard text-entry and printing functions of an electric typewriter with a recording unit, either tape or floppy disk (as used by the Wang machine) with a simple dedicated computer processor for the editing of text. Although features and designs varied among manufacturers and models, and new features were added as technology advanced, the first word processors typically featured a monochrome display and the ability to save documents on memory cards or diskettes. Later models introduced innovations such as spell-checking programs, and improved formatting options.

As the more versatile combination of personal computers and printers became commonplace, and computer software applications for word processing became popular, most business machine companies stopped manufacturing dedicated word processor machines. In 2009 there were only two U.S. companies, Classic and AlphaSmart, which still made them. Many older machines, however, remain in use. Since 2009, Sentinel has offered a machine described as a "word processor", but it is more accurately a highly specialised microcomputer used for accounting and publishing. In 2014, U.S. company Astrohaus launched the Freewrite series of electronic word processors.

Word processing was one of the earliest applications for the personal computer in office productivity, and was the most widely used application on personal computers until the World Wide Web rose to prominence in the mid-1990s.

Although the early word processors evolved to use tag-based markup for document formatting, most modern word processors take advantage of a graphical user interface providing some form of what-you-see-is-what-you-get ("WYSIWYG") editing. Most are powerful systems consisting of one or more programs that can produce a combination of images, graphics and text, the latter handled with type-setting capability. Typical features of a modern word processor include multiple font sets, spell checking, grammar checking, a built-in thesaurus, automatic text correction, web integration, HTML conversion, pre-formatted publication projects such as newsletters and to-do lists, and much more.

Microsoft Word is the most widely used word processing software according to a user tracking system built into the software. Microsoft estimates that roughly half a billion people use the Microsoft Office suite, which includes Word. Many other word processing applications exist, including WordPerfect (which dominated the market from the mid-1980s to early-1990s on computers running Microsoft's MS-DOS operating system, and still (2014) is favored for legal applications), Apple's Pages application, and open source applications such as OpenOffice.org Writer, LibreOffice Writer, AbiWord, KWord, and LyX. Web-based word processors such as Office Online or Google Docs are a relatively new category.

== Characteristics ==
Word processors evolved dramatically once they became software programs rather than dedicated machines. They can usefully be distinguished from text editors, the category of software they evolved from.

A text editor is a program that is used for typing, copying, pasting, and printing text (a single character, or strings of characters). Text editors do not format lines or pages. (There are extensions of text editors which can perform formatting of lines and pages: batch document processing systems, starting with TJ-2 and RUNOFF and still available in such systems as LaTeX and Ghostscript, as well as programs that implement the paged-media extensions to HTML and CSS). Text editors are now used mainly by programmers, website designers, computer system administrators, and, in the case of LaTeX, by mathematicians and scientists (for complex formulas and for citations in rare languages). They are also useful when fast startup times, small file sizes, editing speed, and simplicity of operation are valued, and when formatting is unimportant. Due to their use in managing complex software projects, text editors can sometimes provide better facilities for managing large writing projects than a word processor.

Word processing added to the text editor the ability to control type style and size, to manage lines (word wrap), to format documents into pages, and to number pages. Functions now taken for granted were added incrementally, sometimes by purchase of independent providers of add-on programs. Spell checking, grammar checking and mail merge were some of the most popular add-ons for early word processors. Word processors are also capable of hyphenation, and the management and correct positioning of footnotes and endnotes.

More advanced features found in recent word processors include:

- Collaborative editing, allowing multiple users to work on the same document.
- Indexing assistance. (True indexing, as performed by a professional human indexer, is far beyond current technology, for the same reasons that fully automated, literary-quality machine translation is.)
- Creation of tables of contents.
- Management, editing, and positioning of visual material (illustrations, diagrams), and sometimes sound files.
- Automatically managed (updated) cross-references to pages or notes.
- Version control of a document, permitting reconstruction of its evolution.
- Non-printing comments and annotations.
- Generation of document statistics (characters, words, readability level, time spent editing by each user).
- "Styles", which automate consistent formatting of text body, titles, subtitles, highlighted text, and so on.

Later desktop publishing programs were specifically designed with elaborate pre-formatted layouts for publication, offering only limited options for changing the layout, while allowing users to import text that was written using a text editor or word processor, or type the text in themselves.

== History ==
Word processors are descended from the Friden Flexowriter, which had two punched tape stations and permitted switching from one to the other (thus enabling what was called the "chain" or "form letter", one tape containing names and addresses, and the other the body of the letter to be sent). It did not wrap words, which was begun by IBM's Magnetic Tape Selectric Typewriter (later, Magnetic Card Selectric Typewriter).

=== IBM Selectric ===
Expensive Typewriter, written and improved between 1961 and 1962 by Steve Piner and L. Peter Deutsch, was a text editing program that ran on a DEC PDP-1 computer at MIT. Since it could drive an IBM Selectric typewriter (a letter-quality printer), it may be considered the first-word processing program, but the term word processing itself was only introduced, by IBM's Böblingen Laboratory in the late 1960s.

In 1969, two software based text editing products (Astrotype and Astrocomp) were developed and marketed by Information Control Systems (Ann Arbor Michigan). Both products used the Digital Equipment Corporation PDP-8 mini computer, DECtape (4” reel) randomly accessible tape drives, and a modified version of the IBM Selectric typewriter (the IBM 2741 Terminal). These 1969 products preceded CRT display-based word processors. Text editing was done using a line numbering system viewed on a paper copy inserted in the Selectric typewriter.

Evelyn Berezin invented a Selectric-based word processor in 1969, and founded the Redactron Corporation to market the $8,000 machine. Redactron was sold to Burroughs Corporation in 1976, where the Redactron-II and -III were sold both as standalone units and as peripherals to the company's mainframe computers.

By 1971 word processing was recognized by the New York Times as a "buzz word". A 1974 Times article referred to "the brave new world of Word Processing or W/P. That's International Business Machines talk ... I.B.M. introduced W/P about five years ago for its Magnetic Tape Selectric Typewriter and other electronic razzle-dazzle."

IBM defined the term in a broad and vague way as "the combination of people, procedures, and equipment which transforms ideas into printed communications," and originally used it to include dictating machines and ordinary, manually operated Selectric typewriters. By the early seventies, however, the term was generally understood to mean semiautomated typewriters affording at least some form of editing and correction, and the ability to produce perfect "originals". Thus, the Times headlined a 1974 Xerox product as a "speedier electronic typewriter", but went on to describe the product, which had no screen, as "a word processor rather than strictly a typewriter, in that it stores copy on magnetic tape or magnetic cards for retyping, corrections, and subsequent printout".

=== Mainframe systems ===
In the late 1960s IBM provided a program called FORMAT for generating printed documents on any computer capable of running Fortran IV. Written by Gerald M. Berns, FORMAT was described in his paper "Description of FORMAT, a Text-Processing Program" (Communications of the ACM, Volume 12, Number 3, March, 1969) as "a production program which facilitates the editing and printing of 'finished' documents directly on the printer of a relatively small (64k) computer system. It features good performance, totally free-form input, very flexible formatting capabilities including up to eight columns per page, automatic capitalization, aids for index construction, and a minimum of nontext [control elements] items." Input was normally on punched cards or magnetic tape, with up to 80capital letters and non-alphabetic characters per card. The limited typographical controls available were implemented by control sequences; for example, letters were automatically converted to lower case unless they followed a full stop, that is, the "period" character. Output could be printed on a typical line printer in all-capitals — or in upper and lower case using a special ("TN") printer chain — or could be punched as a paper tape which could be printed, in better than line printer quality, on a Flexowriter. A workalike program with some improvements, DORMAT, was developed and used at University College London.

Electromechanical paper-tape-based equipment such as the Friden Flexowriter had long been available; the Flexowriter allowed for operations such as repetitive typing of form letters (with a pause for the operator to manually type in the variable information), and when equipped with an auxiliary reader, could perform an early version of "mail merge". Circa 1970 it began to be feasible to apply electronic computers to office automation tasks. IBM's Mag Tape Selectric Typewriter (MT/ST) and later Mag Card Selectric (MCST) were early devices of this kind, which allowed editing, simple revision, and repetitive typing, with a one-line display for editing single lines. The first novel to be written on a word processor, the IBM MT/ST, was Len Deighton's Bomber, published in 1970.

=== Effect on office administration ===
The New York Times, reporting on a 1971 business equipment trade show, said

The "buzz word" for this year's show was "word processing", or the use of electronic equipment, such as typewriters; procedures and trained personnel to maximize office efficiency. At the IBM exhibition a girl typed on an electronic typewriter. The copy was received on a magnetic tape cassette which accepted corrections, deletions, and additions and then produced a perfect letter for the boss's signature ...

In 1971, a third of all working women in the United States were secretaries, and they could see that word processing would affect their careers. Some manufacturers, according to a Times article, urged that "the concept of 'word processing' could be the answer to Women's Lib advocates' prayers. Word processing will replace the 'traditional' secretary and give women new administrative roles in business and industry."

The 1970s word processing concept did not refer merely to equipment, but, explicitly, to the use of equipment for "breaking down secretarial labor into distinct components, with some staff members handling typing exclusively while others supply administrative support. A typical operation would leave most executives without private secretaries. Instead one secretary would perform various administrative tasks for three or more secretaries." A 1971 article said that "Some [secretaries] see W/P as a career ladder into management; others see it as a dead-end into the automated ghetto; others predict it will lead straight to the picket line." The National Secretaries Association, which defined secretaries as people who "can assume responsibility without direct supervision", feared that W/P would transform secretaries into "space-age typing pools". The article considered only the organizational changes resulting from secretaries operating word processors rather than typewriters; the possibility that word processors might result in managers creating documents without the intervention of secretaries was not considered—not surprising in an era when few managers, but most secretaries, possessed keyboarding skills.

=== Dedicated models ===
In 1972, Stephen Bernard Dorsey, Founder and President of Canadian company Automatic Electronic Systems (AES), introduced the AES-90, the world's first programmable word processor with a video screen. The real breakthrough by Dorsey's AES team was that their machine stored the operator's texts on magnetic disks. Texts could be retrieved from the disks simply by entering their names at the keyboard. More importantly, a text could be edited, for instance a paragraph moved to a new place, or a spelling error corrected, and these changes were recorded on the magnetic disk.

The AES machine was actually a sophisticated computer that could be reprogrammed by changing the instructions contained within a few chips.

In 1975, Dorsey started Micom Data Systems and introduced the Micom 2000 word processor. The Micom 2000 improved on the AES design by using the Intel 8080 single-chip microprocessor, which made the word processor smaller, less costly to build and supported multiple languages.

Around this time, DeltaData and Wang word processors also appeared, again with a video screen and a magnetic storage disk.

The competitive edge for Dorsey's Micom 2000 was that, unlike many other machines, it was truly programmable. The Micom machine countered the problem of obsolescence by avoiding the limitations of a hard-wired system of program storage. The Micom 2000 utilized RAM, which was mass-produced and totally programmable. The Micom 2000 was said to be a year ahead of its time when it was introduced into a marketplace that represented some pretty serious competition such as IBM, Xerox and Wang Laboratories.

In 1978, Micom partnered with Dutch multinational Philips and Dorsey grew Micom's sales position to number three among major word processor manufacturers, behind only IBM and Wang.

=== Software models ===
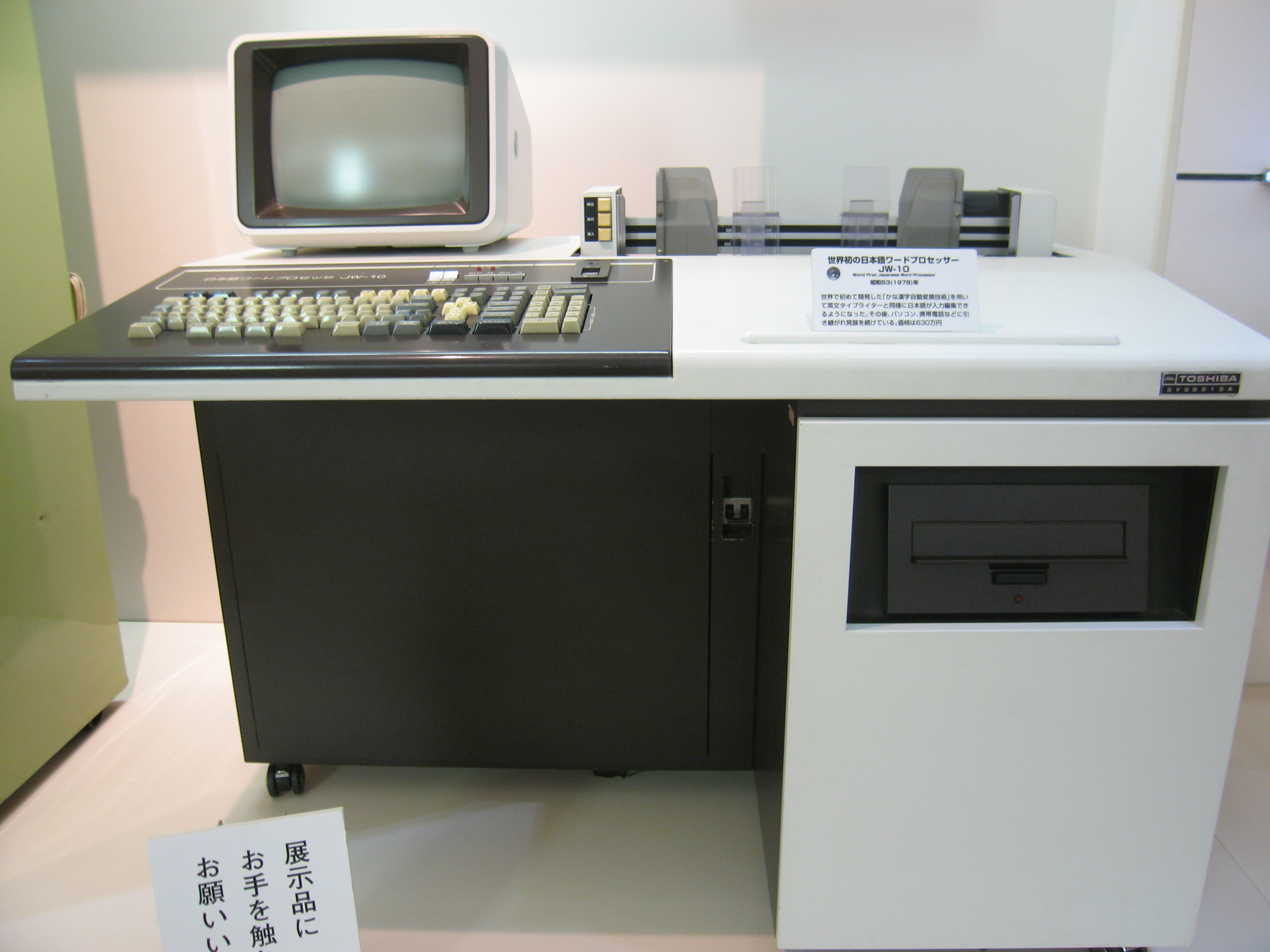
Toshiba JW-10, the first word processor for the Japanese language (1978)

The Wang was not the first CRT-based machine nor were all of its innovations unique to Wang. In the early 1970s Linolex, Lexitron and Vydec introduced pioneering word-processing systems with CRT display editing. A Canadian electronics company, Automatic Electronic Systems, had introduced a product in 1972, but went into receivership a year later. In 1976, refinanced by the Canada Development Corporation, it returned to operation as AES Data, and went on to successfully market its brand of word processors worldwide until its demise in the mid-1980s. Its first office product, the AES-90, combined for the first time a CRT-screen, a floppy-disk and a microprocessor, that is, the very same winning combination that would be used by IBM for its PC seven years later. The AES-90 software was able to handle French and English typing from the start, displaying and printing the texts side-by-side, a Canadian government requirement. The first eight units were delivered to the office of the then Prime Minister, Pierre Elliot Trudeau, in February 1974. Despite these predecessors, Wang's product was a standout, and by 1978 it had sold more of these systems than any other vendor.

The phrase "word processor" rapidly came to refer to CRT-based machines similar to the AES 90. Numerous machines of this kind emerged, typically marketed by traditional office-equipment companies such as IBM, Lanier (marketing AES Data machines, re-badged), CPT, and NBI. All were specialized, dedicated, proprietary systems, priced around $10,000. Cheap general-purpose computers were still for hobbyists.

Some of the earliest CRT-based machines used cassette tapes for removable-memory storage until floppy diskettes became available for this purpose - first the 8-inch floppy, then the 5¼-inch (drives by Shugart Associates and diskettes by Dysan).

Printing of documents was initially accomplished using IBM Selectric typewriters modified for ASCII-character input. These were later replaced by application-specific daisy wheel printers, first developed by Diablo, which became a Xerox company, and later by Qume. For quicker "draft" printing, dot-matrix line printers were optional alternatives with some word processors.

=== WYSIWYG models ===
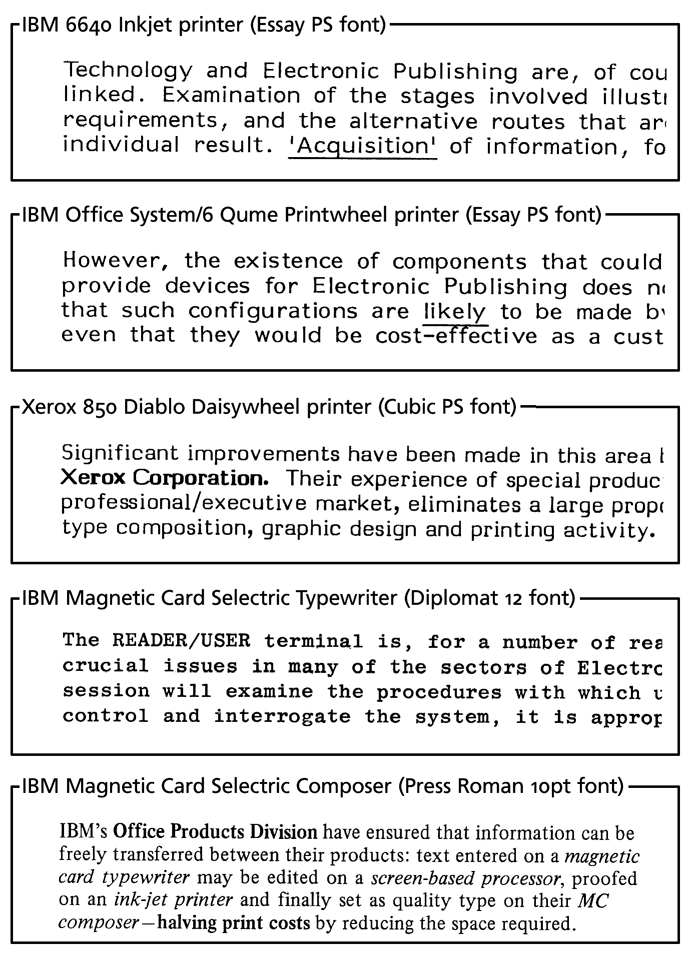
Examples of standalone word processor typefaces c. 1980–1981

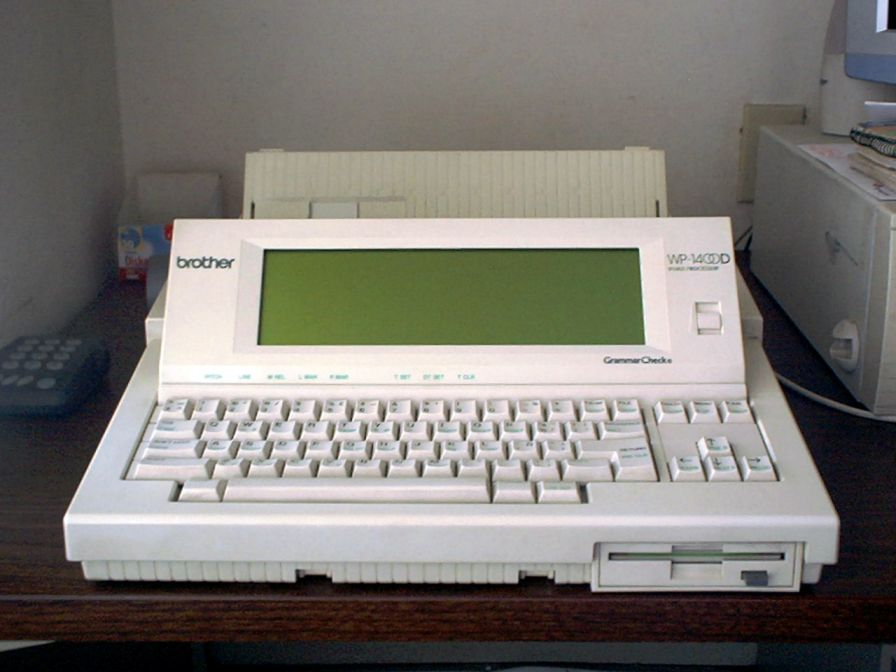
Brother WP-1400D editing electronic typewriter (1994)

Electric Pencil, released in December 1976, was the first word processor software for microcomputers. Software-based word processors running on general-purpose personal computers gradually displaced dedicated word processors, and the term came to refer to software rather than hardware. Some programs were modeled after particular dedicated WP hardware. MultiMate, for example, was written for an insurance company that had hundreds of typists using Wang systems, and spread from there to other Wang customers. To adapt to the smaller, more generic PC keyboard, MultiMate used stick-on labels and a large plastic clip-on template to remind users of its dozens of Wang-like functions, using the shift, alt and ctrl keys with the 10 IBM function keys and many of the alphabet keys.

Other early word-processing software required users to memorize semi-mnemonic key combinations rather than pressing keys labelled "copy" or "bold". (Many early PCs lacked cursor keys; WordStar famously used the E-S-D-X-centered "diamond" for cursor navigation, and modern vi-like editors encourage use of hjkl for navigation.) However, the price differences between dedicated word processors and general-purpose PCs, and the value added to the latter by software such as VisiCalc, were so compelling that personal computers and word processing software soon became serious competition for the dedicated machines. Word processing became the most popular use for personal computers, and unlike the spreadsheet (dominated by Lotus 1-2-3) and database (dBase) markets, WordPerfect, XyWrite, Microsoft Word, pfs:Write, and dozens of other word processing software brands competed in the 1980s; PC Magazine reviewed 57 different programs in one January 1986 issue. Development of higher-resolution monitors allowed them to provide limited WYSIWYG—What You See Is What You Get, to the extent that typographical features like bold and italics, indentation, justification and margins were approximated on screen.

The mid-to-late 1980s saw the spread of laser printers, a "typographic" approach to word processing, and of true WYSIWYG bitmap displays with multiple fonts (pioneered by the Xerox Alto computer and Bravo word processing program), PostScript, and graphical user interfaces (another Xerox PARC innovation, with the Gypsy word processor which was commercialised in the Xerox Star product range). Standalone word processors adapted by getting smaller and replacing their CRTs with small character-oriented LCD displays. Some models also had computer-like features such as floppy disk drives and the ability to output to an external printer. They also got a name change, now being called "electronic typewriters" and typically occupying a lower end of the market, selling for under US$200.

During the late 1980s and into the 1990s the predominant word processing program was WordPerfect. It had more than 50% of the worldwide market as late as 1995, but by 2000 Microsoft Word had up to 95% market share.

MacWrite, Microsoft Word, and other word processing programs for the bit-mapped Apple Macintosh screen, introduced in 1984, were probably the first true WYSIWYG word processors to become known to many people until the introduction of Microsoft Windows. Dedicated word processors eventually became museum pieces.

== See also ==
- Amstrad PCW
- Authoring systems
- Canon Cat
- Comparison of word processors
- Content management system
- CPT Word Processors
- Document collaboration
- List of word processors
- IBM MT/ST
- Microwriter
- Office suite
- TeX
- Typography

== Literature ==
- Matthew G. Kirschenbaum Track Changes - A Literary History of Word Processing Harvard University Press 2016 ISBN 9780674417076
