= STAR (software) =

Educational assessment software

STAR Reading, STAR Early Literacy, and STAR Math
- STAR Reading and STAR Early Literacy (blue) and STAR Math (green) logos.

- "Splash screen" for "STAR Reading Management," the teacher/administrator access to STAR Reading, version 2.3 for Microsoft Windows.
- Developer: Renaissance Learning
- Stable release: STAR Math 2.1.3, STAR Reading 2.4.2
- Operating system: Windows, Mac
- Type: Educational
- Website: www.renaissance.com

STAR Reading, STAR Early Literacy and STAR Math are standardized, computer-adaptive assessments created by Renaissance Learning, Inc., for use in K–12 education. Each is a "Tier 2" assessment of a skill (reading practice, math practice, and early literacy, respectively that can be used any number of times due to item-bank technology. These assessments fall somewhere between progress monitoring tools ("Tier 1") and high-stakes tests.

== Original meaning ==
The acronym STAR, which used to stand for "Standardized Test for the Assessment of Reading" no longer carries this meaning. The company has expanded STAR assessments to cover skills in various domains apart from reading. Initially known as "STAR", the first assessment was STAR Reading. Since the creation of STAR Math, the original STAR has been renamed to STAR Reading. Confusion may also arise with California's STAR (Standardized Testing and Reporting) or the Supplementary Tests of Achievement in Reading published by the New Zealand Council for Educational Research, but these are completely different assessments.

== Purpose ==
The purpose of the STAR assessments is to provide information to teachers about student growth and student achievement in grade 1–12. The assessments is taken by students and it is scored automatically by the software. In order to monitor students' progress, teachers and administrators are allowed to view and print a number of reports at the individual, classroom, and grade level and then give instructions to individuals and to high-stakes testing requirements.

== STAR assessments ==
Each assessment provides estimates of students' skills and comparisons of students' abilities to national norms. Each is intended to aid with developing curriculum and instruction by providing feedback about student, classroom, and grade level progress. The software reports grade equivalents, percentile ranks, and normal curve equivalents.

Each assessment is standardized and highly correlated to other assessments. Thus, the results predict achievement on other standardized tests. For more on the reliability and validity of these assessments, see below.

All STAR products were available as stand-alone and network software, but now the company strongly advertises the web-based Renaissance Place version.

=== STAR Reading ===
The purpose of STAR Reading is to assess students' reading skills. The assessment provides an approximate measure of each students' reading level. The company claims that students can complete the assessment in less than 10 minutes.

=== STAR Early Literacy ===
The purpose of STAR Early Literacy is to assess students' early literacy skills in preparation for reading. SEL identifies student reading levels (e.g. Emergent Reader) and provides student performance results for pre-K through third grade students. The company claims that students can complete the assessment in less than 10 minutes.

=== STAR Math ===
The purpose of STAR Math is to assess students' mathematics skills. The assessment provides an approximate measure of each students' math level. The company claims that students can complete the assessment in less than 12 minutes.

=== STAR Spanish ===
The purpose of STAR Spanish is to assess students' Spanish skills. The assessment consists of reading comprehension for independent readers from grade levels 1–5. However, it can be administered to Spanish speaking students at grade levels 1–12. STAR Spanish tracks students' Spanish reading level, ZPD for independent reading practice of Spanish literature, Spanish reading growth and overall progress.

== Reliability and validity ==
The reliability of an assessment is the extent to which scores from the assessment will remain the same between two administrations within a short period. The validity of an assessment is the extent to which the assessment measures what it claims to measure.

Many other studies have demonstrated the reliability and validity of STAR Reading, STAR Math, and STAR Early Literacy. Additionally, many studies have differentiated between STAR assessments and other tests of similar skills. As with any assessment or test, student scores will vary each time the assessment or test is administered. This concept is called the statistical error of a measurement.

External agencies, like the National Center on Student Progress Monitoring (NCSPM), have assessed the STAR products and found them to be technically sound. Additionally, the Southwest Educational Development Laboratory (SEDL) has categorized STAR Reading and STAR Early Literacy as criterion-referenced and norm-referenced assessments. In this latter case, the STAR Early Literacy package is said to evaluate eight cognitive elements.

STAR Early Literacy was mentioned in the 2006 Readers' Choice Awards: Best Reading Software, a survey by e-School News.

=== Criticism ===
The Illinois State Board of Education (ISBE) stated in a Summer 2005 letter that it would no longer accept STAR Reading scores for measuring reading "performance progress" for the Reading Improvement Block Grant. However, STAR reading was still permitted for instructional decision-making. Since the ISBE issued this letter in 2005, they have updated its database and ISBE has now re-categorized STAR Reading as an assessment of reading comprehension.

== See also ==
- Accelerated Reader
- Accelerated Math
