= Renaissance Learning =

American educational software company

Renaissance
- Company type: Private
- Industry: Educational software
- Founded: 1986; 40 years ago
- Founders: Judith and Terrance Paul
- Headquarters: Wisconsin Rapids, Wisconsin, U.S.
- Area served: International
- Key people: Chris Bauleke, CEO
- Products: Accelerated Reader, Accelerated Reader 360, English in a Flash, Accelerated Math, MathFacts in a Flash, Star 360, myON Reader, Nearpod, Flocabulary, Freckle, Lalilo
- Number of employees: 1,200 (as of June 1, 2017)
- Parent: Francisco Partners
- Subsidiaries: AlphaSmart; Humanities Software, Inc.; Renaissance Learning UK Ltd.; Renaissance Corporate Services
- Website: renaissance.com

Renaissance Learning, Inc. (also known simply as Renaissance) is a software as a service and learning analytics company that makes Pre-K–12 educational software and adaptive assessments. Renaissance employs about 1,000 employees in nine U.S. cities and subsidiaries in Canada, the United Kingdom, Korea, and Australia. The company is known for creating Accelerated Reader and Star computer-adaptive assessments.

== History ==
The company was founded in 1986 by Judith and Terrance Paul after Judith developed Accelerated Reader, originally named Read Up!, in the basement of her home in Port Edwards, Wisconsin. Judith designed Accelerated Reader to encourage her children to read more books. Read Up! changed its name to Advantage Learning Systems, Inc., in 1991. On September 25, 1997, the company had its initial public offering and was traded on the Nasdaq exchange under the ticker ALSI. It adopted the name Renaissance Learning in 2001. In 2005, Renaissance acquired AlphaSmart for $57 million in cash and stock.

The company was publicly traded until October 2011, when Permira purchased all outstanding shares and maintained ownership of Renaissance until selling the company in 2014 to Hellman & Friedman for $1.1 billion. CapitalG, a sister company to Google and subsidiary of Alphabet Inc., became an equity investor in Renaissance in 2014. In February 2015, Renaissance acquired UClass, a cloud-based storage and content management service. In 2016, Renaissance re-branded and dropped "Learning" from their name. In May 2018 the company was acquired by private equity firm Francisco Partners.

In 2019, Renaissance acquired Schoolzilla. In February 2021, it acquired Nearpod and Flocabulary, and the French education company Lalilo.

== Reception ==
In June 2016, the United States Department of Education's Institute of Education Sciences in What Works Clearinghouse found Accelerated Reader to have mixed effects on comprehension for beginning readers. The company's programs have been criticized for potentially limiting a student's recreational reading to a list of books that fall in their book level, in order to accrue "points", and trivializing books and undermining reading by reducing it to a competitive game. Susan Straight in The New York Times says, "the passion and serendipity of choosing a book at the library based on the subject or the cover of the first page is nearly gone, as well as the excitement of reading a book simply for pleasure. This is not all the fault of Renaissance, which I believe is trying to help schools encourage students to read."
