= Stephen Dorsey =

Stephen Dorsey may refer to:

- Stephen Wallace Dorsey (1842–1916), United States Senator from Arkansas
- Stephen Bernard Dorsey (born 1937), Canadian entrepreneur
