= Terrance Paul =

Terrance David Paul, also known as Terry Paul (1946–2014), was an American software developer who created Accelerated Reader.

== Life and career ==
Paul was born in 1946 in Streator, Illinois. He grew up in Rock Island, Illinois.

Paul attended the University of Illinois and received his bachelor's degree in economics. Later, he joined Bradley University and received a master's of business administration.

Paul started his career in 1968, when he joined Caterpillar Tractor. In 1980, a computer backup systems developer, then known as Best Power Technology.

In 1986, Paul started Advantage Learning Systems with his wife Judi to develop software. He also founded LENA Research Foundation. LENA was developed by him in 2002 to measure children's language development.
