= Accelerated Math =

Mathematics education software

- Developer: Renaissance Learning
- Stable release: 2.42
- Operating system: Windows, Mac
- Type: Educational
- Website: http://www.renlearn.com/am/

Accelerated Math is a daily, progress-monitoring software tool that monitors and manages mathematics skills practice, from preschool math through calculus. It is primarily used by primary and secondary schools, and it is published by Renaissance Learning, Inc. Currently, there are five versions: a desktop version and a web-based version in Renaissance Place, the company's web software for Accelerated Math and a number of other software products (e.g. Accelerated Reader). In Australia and the United Kingdom, the software is referred to as "Accelerated Maths".

== Research ==
Below is a sample of some of the most current research on Accelerated Math.

Sadusky and Brem (2002) studied the impact of first-year implementation of Accelerated Math in a K-6 urban elementary school during the 2001–2002 school year. The researchers found that teachers were able to immediately use data to make decisions about instruction in the classroom. The students in classrooms using Accelerated Math had twice the percentile gains when tested as compared to the control classrooms that did not use Accelerated Math.

Ysseldkyke and Tardrew (2003) studied 2,202 students in 125 classrooms encompassing 24 states. The results showed that when students using Accelerated Math were compared to a control group, those students using the software made a significant gains on the STAR Math test. Students in grades 3 through 10 that were using Accelerated Math had more than twice the percentile gains on these tests than students in the control group.

Ysseldyke, Betts, Thill, and Hannigan (2004) conducted a quasi-experimental study with third- through sixth-grade Title I students. They found that Title I students who used Accelerated Math outperformed students who did not. Springer, Pugalee, and Algozzine (2005) also discovered a similar pattern. They studied students who failed to pass the AIMS test in order to graduate. Over half of the students passed the test after taking a course in which Accelerated Math was used to improve their achievement.

The What Works Clearinghouse (2008) within the Institute of Educational Sciences concluded that studies they evaluated did not show statistically significant gains when put through the US government's analysis.

For more research, see the link below.
