= AES-90 =

Early word processing system

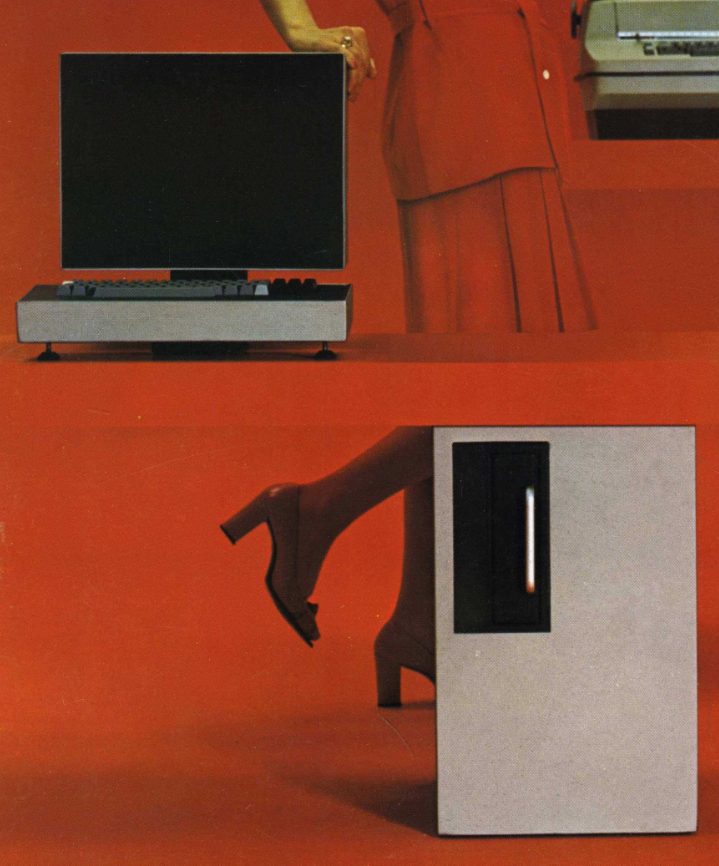
- An AES-90 word processor from 1974.
- Developer: Stephen B. Dorsey
- Manufacturer: Automatic Electronic Systems (AES) Inc.
- Type: Word processor
- Generation: First
- Released: late 1974
- Introductory price: $17,400 (as of April 1977)
- Units sold: Around 100, as of September 1974
- CPU: AES-80, custom TTL "microprocessor"
- Removable storage: 8" floppy disks
- Display: CRT, 80-column and 128-column modes
- Made in: Canada

The AES-90 was a pioneering electronic word processing system developed by Stephen B. Dorsey and manufactured by his company, Automatic Electronic Systems (AES) Inc., and their subsidiary AES Data Ltd., beginning in late 1974. By April 1977, the AES-90 cost $17,400.

The AES-90 was notable for being one the first electronic word processors with interactive text editing capabilities, facilitated by the included CRT display, as well as being one of the earliest non-IBM computer systems to utilize floppy disks as a storage medium.

== Microprocessor ==
The AES-90 contained an entire minicomputer, the AES-80, built out of off-the-shelf TTL logic components. Despite often being described as a "microprocessor" in contemporaneous marketing, the AES-80 did not contain any LSI circuitry, and was merely termed as such due to its small size. The AES-80 had been introduced as a separate product in May 1972 as a low-cost (<$1,000) minicomputer for industrial and intelligent terminal applications.

== Display ==
The AES-90 offered a WYSIWYG display interface, which included commands for centering, justifying, cutting, inserting, and otherwise manipulating blocks of text, which could be instantly previewed on the display. Additionally, it also had the capability to split one page into two and produce up to 2000 personalized letters with custom mailing addresses.

== Storage ==
The AES-90 was one of the very first commercially available computer systems to utilize floppy disks and drives. According to the brochure, each disk could hold up to "340,000 words," which in this context were actual words, and not a unit of computer memory.

== Acquisition by Innocan ==
In May 1973, Innocan Investments Ltd. was formed, in which the Canada Development Corporation (CDC) acquired a 40% stake of interest. The 1974 annual report from CDC indicated that AES Data Ltd. had been acquired by Innocan, and that AES-90 systems were in full production. By the end of 1975, Innocan had acquired an 82% share in AES Data.
