= Astrohaus =

American technology company

- Company type: Private
- Industry: Consumer electronics
- Founded: 2014; 12 years ago in Detroit, Michigan
- Founders: Adam Leeb; Patrick Paul
- Products: Typewriter; Electronic word processor; Computer keyboard

Astrohaus is an American technology company founded in 2014 by Adam Leeb and Patrick Paul. It designs and produces portable digital typewriters, word processors and computer keyboards.

Astrohaus was formed after a successful Kickstarter campaign in 2014 to launch the Hemingwrite, an electronic typewriter with an e-ink screen. Due to legal reasons, the product was renamed the Freewrite, and Astrohaus was formed.

Since its formation, Astrohaus has released several products under the Freewrite brand in different variations, including the Smart Typewriter, Alpha, and Traveler. In addition, the company produces official accessories, writing software, and optional cloud services. The Astrohaus website also sells third-party desk toys and writing tools.

Astrohaus products have received mixed reviews by technology publications. The metal construction of the Smart Typewriter, and the keyboard feel of their devices, are typically the subject of positive reviews. However, the relatively high price is often cited as a criticism, particularly in contrast to laptops and other writing devices, as is the plastic construction of the Alpha and Traveler which has been described as "cheap" by multiple reviewers.

== History ==
In 2014, Leeb and Paul started a Kickstarter campaign for the Hemingwrite, a portable electronic typewriter with an e-ink screen, mechanical keyboard, memory storage, and an aluminum case. The product was pitched as a "distraction-free" writing device.

Following the campaign, Astrohaus began taking public orders for the Smart Typewriter in 2016. The company started a crowdfund project for their second product, the Traveler, on Indiegogo in 2018. In 2024, Astrohaus followed up with the Alpha, which was also subject to a crowdfunding campaign, and was their third word processor in the Freewrite series.

In 2025, Astrohaus announced the Freewrite Wordrunner, a mechanical computer keyboard with additional features for document navigation and timing. Astrohaus is intending to raise funds on Kickstarter, with a campaign planned for March 2025.

== Smart Typewriter ==
Freewrite Smart Typewriter
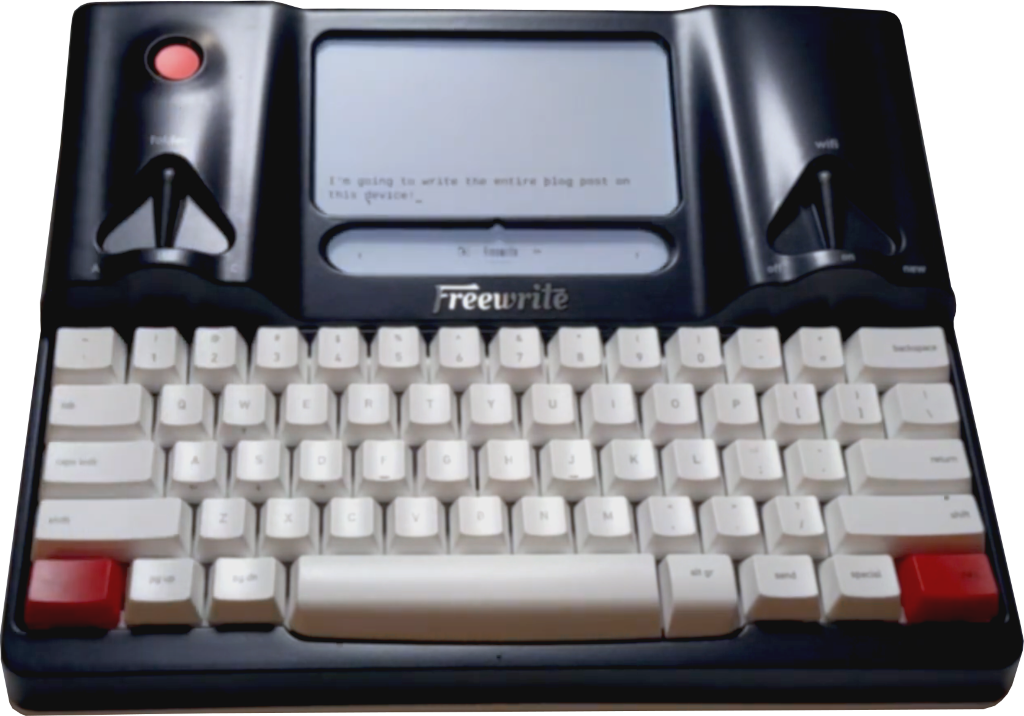
- Manufacturer: Astrohaus
- Type: Typewriter
- Generation: 1, 2, 3
- Storage: Embedded flash memory
- Display: E-Ink screen w/ frontlight
- Input: Full-size mechanical keyboard, Kailh Box Brown switches (gen 3) or Cherry MX (gen 1 & 2)
- Connectivity: USB-C, 2.4 Ghz Wi-Fi
- Power: Lithium-ion polymer battery
- Dimensions: 11.7 in × 9.3 in × 2.8 in (29.7 cm × 23.6 cm × 7.1 cm)
- Weight: 4.0 lb (1.8 kg)

The Freewrite Smart Typewriter is the first dedicated writing device by Astrohaus, revealed in a Kickstarter campaign in 2014 and sold publicly in 2016, originally named the Hemingwrite. It's uses black aluminum for the body, a front-lit e-ink screen, a full mechanical keyboard, Wi-Fi, and embedded storage. As of generation 3, the keyboard uses Kailh Box brown switches and supports 60 languages and 85 layouts.

=== Generations ===
There are different generations of the Smart Typewriter with minor iterations in the hardware and feel, and different levels of support for future software updates.

Generation	Release year	Notes
1	2014	Original version w/ Cherry key switches
2	2017 (Fall)	Improved battery and keyboard design, supports 20+ languages
3	2022 (January)	E-Ink panel with frontlight, improved battery, new processor, keyboard changed to Kailh Box Brown switches

=== Ernest Hemingway Signature Edition ===
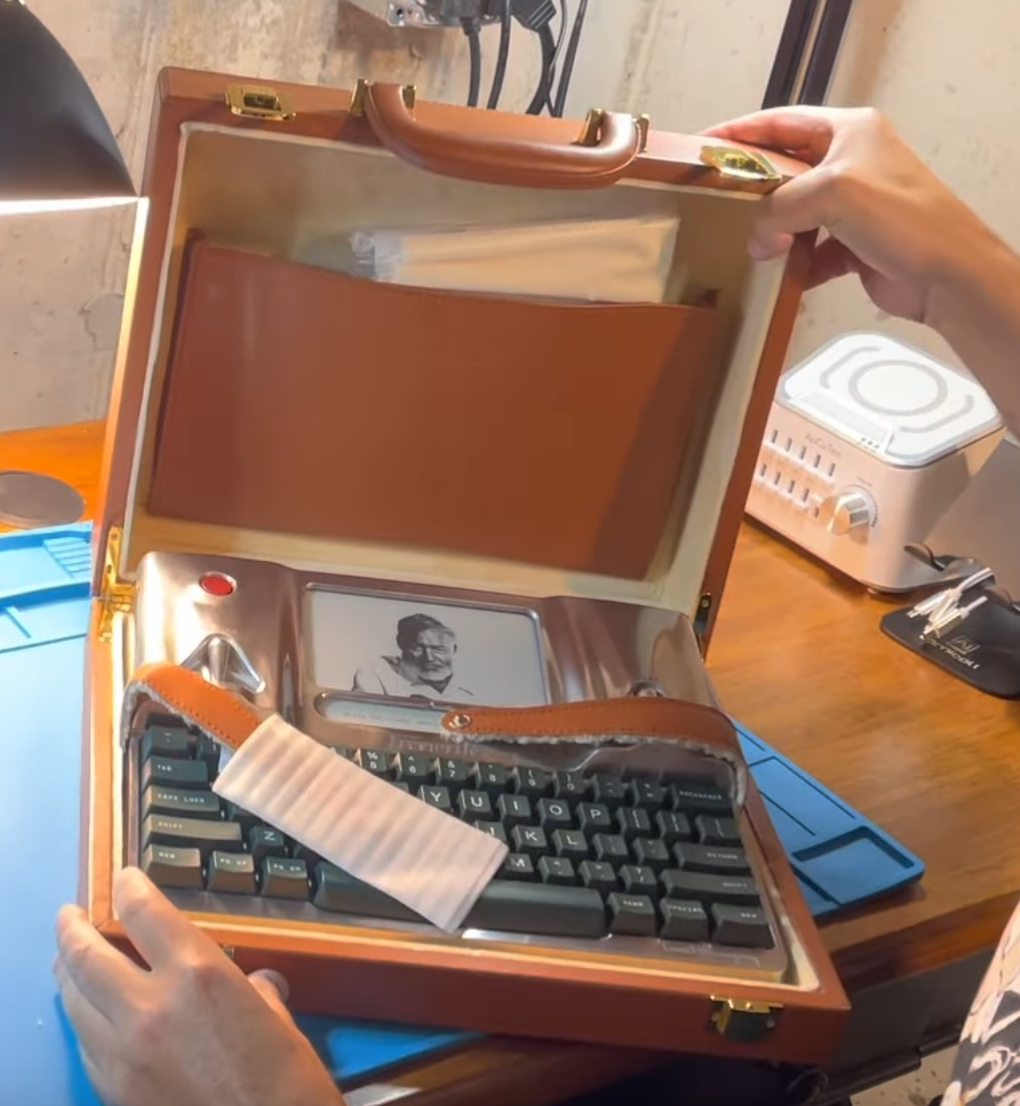
The Ernest Hemingway Signature Edition of the Freewrite Smart Typewriter

In 2021, Astrohaus released the Hemingwrite edition based on the second-generation model (also marketed as the Ernest Hemingway Freewrite Signature Edition) in collaboration with Hemingway's estate. This is not to be confused with the original version from the Kickstarter campaign, which is essentially the base Smart Typewriter model. The licensed Hemingwrite version has a hand-polished aluminum body in silver, dark green keys, and a leather briefcase. Hemingway's signature is engraved on the case, and an image of Hemingway appears on screen.

== Traveler ==
Freewrite Traveler
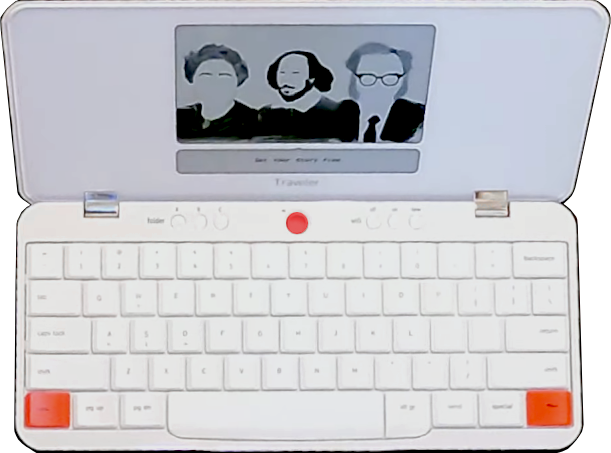
- Manufacturer: Astrohaus
- Type: Electronic word processor
- Generation: 1
- Released: 2018
- Storage: Embedded flash memory
- Display: E-Ink screen
- Input: Full-size scissor switch
- Connectivity: USB-C, 2.4 Ghz Wi-Fi
- Power: Lithium-ion polymer battery
- Dimensions: 11.3 in × 5.0 in × 0.97 in (28.7 cm × 12.7 cm × 2.5 cm)
- Weight: 1.6 lb (0.73 kg)

The Freewrite Traveler is an ultra-portable digital word processor with a clamshell design made from polycarbonate. It is primarily intended for portability, and unlike the Smart Typewriter and Alpha, it does not use a mechanical keyboard, opting for a full-size scissor switch keyboard instead. It also uses an E-Ink screen, storage, battery, and Wi-Fi.

The Traveler was crowdfunded via Indiegogo in 2018, with the first units shipped in January 2019. The original model featured a white interior and red accents on some of the buttons, and a glossy black outer case. The Traveler also has a document manager built into the software, with physical buttons unlike the folder switch on the Smart Typewriter. Some reviewers have compared the device to a laptop due to its form factor, and Astrohaus has marketed it as a potential laptop alternative.

In November 2023, Astrohaus released the Ghost edition, which featured a fully transparent case and transparent keys; it was intended as a limited edition with only one batch produced. The device was reportedly inspired by the transparent plastic fad of the 1990s and Y2K-era aesthetic.

Models

Version	Release year	Limited edition	Notes
Traveler	2020	No	Original model
Ghost	2023	Yes	Transparent version

== Alpha ==
Freewrite Alpha
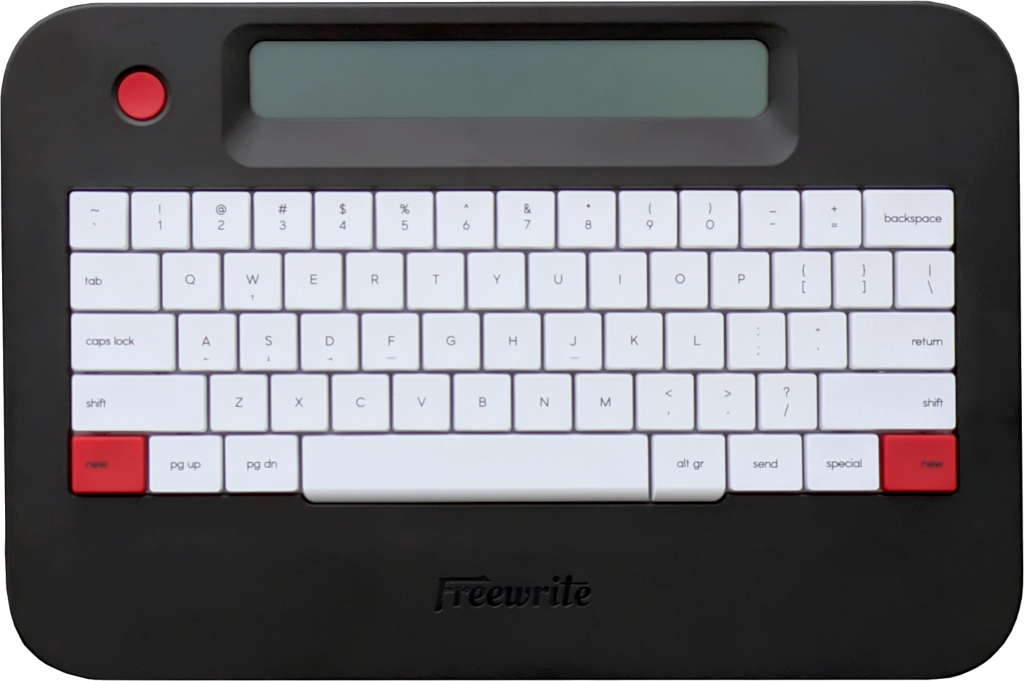
- The original Raven Black edition
- Manufacturer: Astrohaus
- Type: Electronic word processor
- Generation: 1
- Released: 2023 (pre-order)
- CPU: ESP32-S3-WROOM-1
- Storage: Embedded flash memory
- Display: FSTN LCD Display (164 mm × 25 mm (6.46 in × 0.98 in))
- Connectivity: USB-C, 2.4 Ghz Wi-Fi
- Power: Lithium-ion polymer battery
- Dimensions: 12.6 in × 8.5 in × 0.8 in (32.0 cm × 21.6 cm × 2.0 cm)
- Weight: 1.6 lb (0.73 kg)

The Freewrite Alpha is a digital word processor which uses a mechanical keyboard, LED display, Wi-Fi, battery, built-in storage, and a polycarbonate construction. It was developed as a portable and more affordable version of the Smart Typewriter. It was available for pre-order in 2023 and went on sale in January 2024. The Alpha bears similarities in name and design to the AlphaSmart range of typing devices produced for the education sector, and has been described as its spiritual successor; Astrohaus subsequently bought the AlphaSmart domain name and redirected it to the Freewrite storefront.

The Alpha uses a full-size mechanical keyboard based on Kailh Choc V2 low-profile switches. It has replaceable key caps, albeit some function keys have non-standard mounting points and require specialty caps. It also has a kickstand at the back of the device. The first standard version of the Alpha was styled after the Smart Typerwriter colorway, with the Lunar model offered as a special edition. The Alpha features a reflective FSTN LCD display, but since 2024, new limited-edition models use a non-reflective display with a backlight.

=== Models ===
Version	Release year	Limited edition	Notes
Raven Black w/o Backlight	2023	No	Original model
Lunar w/o Backlight	2023	Yes	Bespeckled cream case with dark keys
Cosmic	2024	Yes	Bespeckled colors on case and some colored keys, backlit, includes limited edition cover case
Lunar	2024	Yes	Backlit version
Raven Black	2025	No	Backlit version

== Wordrunner ==
The Freewrite Wordrunner is an upcoming mechanical keyboard. It will be the first product in the Freewrite lineup which is not a dedicated word processor. Astrohaus has set up a refundable $1 reservation page, but has yet to release the product, intending to raise funds through a Kickstarter campaign in March 2025. A prototype of the device appeared at CES 2025.

The Wordrunner is slated to have unorthodox features intended for writers, including a physical word counter and a red joystick button.

== Reception ==
Professional reviews of Astrohaus products have been mixed, with common concerns being the high retail price (relative to other devices like laptops) and the plastic construction of some models. Tom Brant of PCMag described the Traveler as an improvement on traditional typewriters, but questioned the price, writing "it works best for people [...] who set aside a block of time each day to try to induce creativity and let the words flow. But even if you’re able to do this, $429 is a lot of money to spend on a device with such a singular purpose." In the same publication, Will Greenwald gave a positive review of the Smart Typewriter, complimenting the aluminum body and mechanical keyboard, writing "it’s very much a single-purpose device, and that can make its price seem exorbitant unless it’s exactly what you’re looking for".

Joshua Hawkins of Lifehacker Australia wrote that the Alpha model was best for drafts and praised the portability and concept, but criticized the cheap feel and build quality, writing "the fact that the entire device is just plastic makes it obnoxiously loud to type on" and describing the price as "horrible." In another piece about the Alpha, Séamus Bellamy wrote for Reviewed that they liked the keyboard and "instant-on" functionality, but found the device felt "cheap" and that the screen is "terrible for reviewing what you’ve just finished writing", considering it a niche product: "all of what it lacks is what makes it worth considering if you’re a writer who lacks focus and wants to be more productive."
