= AlphaSmart =

Education technology company

AlphaSmart, Inc.
- Formerly: Intelligent Peripheral Devices, Inc.
- Company type: Public
- Industry: Computer
- Founded: 1992; 34 years ago in Los Gatos, California
- Founders: Joe Barrus; Ketan Kothari
- Defunct: 2005; 21 years ago
- Fate: Acquired by Renaissance Learning, Inc.
- Products: Educational portable computers

AlphaSmart, Inc., formerly Intelligent Peripheral Devices, Inc., was an education technology company founded in 1992 by Apple Computer engineers Joe Barrus and Ketan Kothari, and Kothari's brother, Manish Kothari. At the time of their initial release in 1993, the first AlphaSmart models were marketed as smart keyboards designed to promote writing in the classroom as an alternative to expensive computer labs. The units' durability, long battery life, and limited functionality made them ideal for K-12 classrooms. Later models expanded functionality to spell-checking, running applications, and accessing wireless printers.

After their initial public offering in 2004, AlphaSmart, Inc. was quickly acquired by Renaissance Learning, Inc., in 2005. The last AlphaSmart branded device, named the Neo 2, was released by Renaissance Learning in 2007. 6 years later in late September 2013, production of all AlphaSmart branded devices was discontinued. While AlphaSmart no longer exists as a brand, they have developed a cult following among writers as distraction-free writing devices, supporting a strong secondhand market.

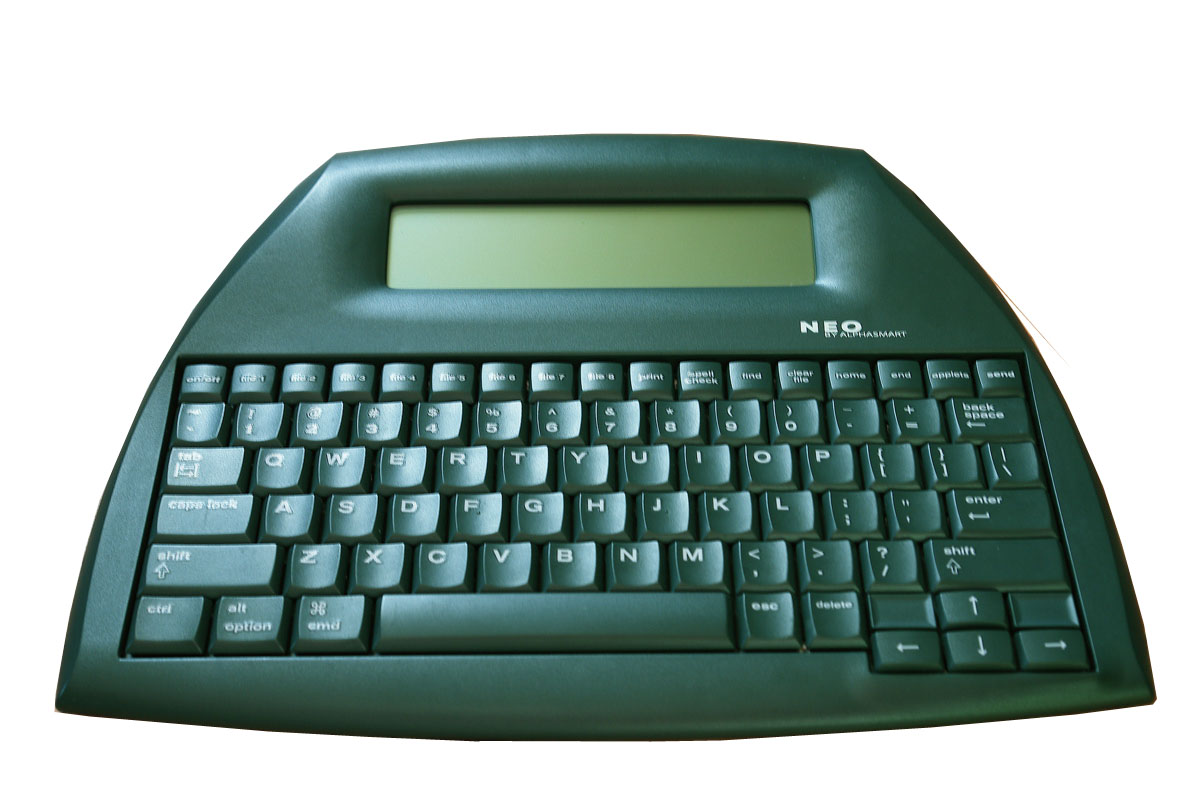
AlphaSmart Neo

== Background ==
The AlphaSmart was a keyboarding device that enabled a person to work on the go, much like a laptop computer, but it was strictly for word processing, as it functioned essentially like a simple digital typewriter. The Dana (one of the last devices made by AlphaSmart) was an exception, as this device also ran Palm OS applications. Since the AlphaSmart, Dana, and NEO were specialized for limited purposes, they were generally much cheaper than a standard laptop computer. All of these devices were meant to be plugged into an ADB, PS/2, or USB port for transferring the written text into a computer's word processing document for further editing (such as indentation and font preference) or printing if so desired.

The AlphaSmart saved every keystroke directly to the machine's RAM, which was maintained by a battery backup even when powered down. AlphaSmarts could transfer data either by a special program that communicated with the AlphaSmart or by the simpler method of transmitting the keystrokes of the written text as if it were the computer's keyboard. When not transferring text, the AlphaSmart could be used as a standard keyboard.

AlphaSmarts were very popular in schools for their affordability and durability. Elementary schools and high schools used them; and they were particularly popular among special education departments for use by students with graphomotor challenges.

The machines were also popular among journalists and writers, who found them easy to carry and appreciated the full-size keyboard and long battery life. AlphaSmarts continue to be popular with small groups of writers, despite attempts by other companies as early as 2014 to produce other low-distraction writing tools.

== Company ==
Intelligent Peripheral Devices, Inc. was founded in 1992 by two previous Apple Computer engineers, Ketan Kothari and Joe Barrus, with the mission to "develop and market affordable, portable personal learning solutions for the classroom" and to "deliver affordable, lightweight, rugged portable computing devices that are expandable, easy to use and manage, and provide exceptional battery life." Shortly after its founding, they were joined by Ketan's brother, Manish. Later, they changed the name of the company to AlphaSmart, Inc.

Barrus and Kothari also hold a US patent on a "portable keyboard computer", applied for in 1992 and granted in 1995.

AlphaSmart, Inc. completed its initial public offering (IPO) on the NASDAQ on February 6, 2004 and started trading under the symbol ALSM. In June 2005, it was acquired by Renaissance Learning (NASDAQ: RLRN). The name changed again in the Spring of 2009, this time to NEO Direct, Inc. They went on to release the NEO2 and 2Know Responder hardware products.

== AlphaSmart products ==
=== AlphaSmart ===
The original AlphaSmart computer companion was shipped in August 1993, and worked only with Apple Macintosh and Apple IIGS computers, plugging into the Apple Desktop Bus (ADB) port. This model provided customers with 16 "pages" of memory (32,000 bytes) for eight separate files (2 pages per file), that were accessed by pressing the corresponding function key. The AlphaSmart took on the aesthetics of the computer it was intended to be partnered with – it had a boxy, durable beige plastic case like the IIGS and Macintoshes of that era. It had a four-line LCD character display similar to what one would find on some appliances. Each character was displayed in its own LCD "box," making the point size and font type fixed. The AlphaSmart could not display graphics, except for ASCII art. It ran on 2 AA batteries and could be used for days at a time due to a power-saving technique that effectively allowed it to "sleep" between keystrokes. There was a rechargeable nickel-cadmium battery (NiCad) pack add-on that a customer could purchase separately.

The early AlphaSmart models included a couple of jokes, including a reference to The Hitchhiker's Guide to the Galaxy. If, while using the calculator, the answer is 42, the words "The answer to Life, the Universe, and Everything" appear. Or, if the input was 1+1, the calculator would say, "That's too easy."

==== AlphaSmart Pro ====
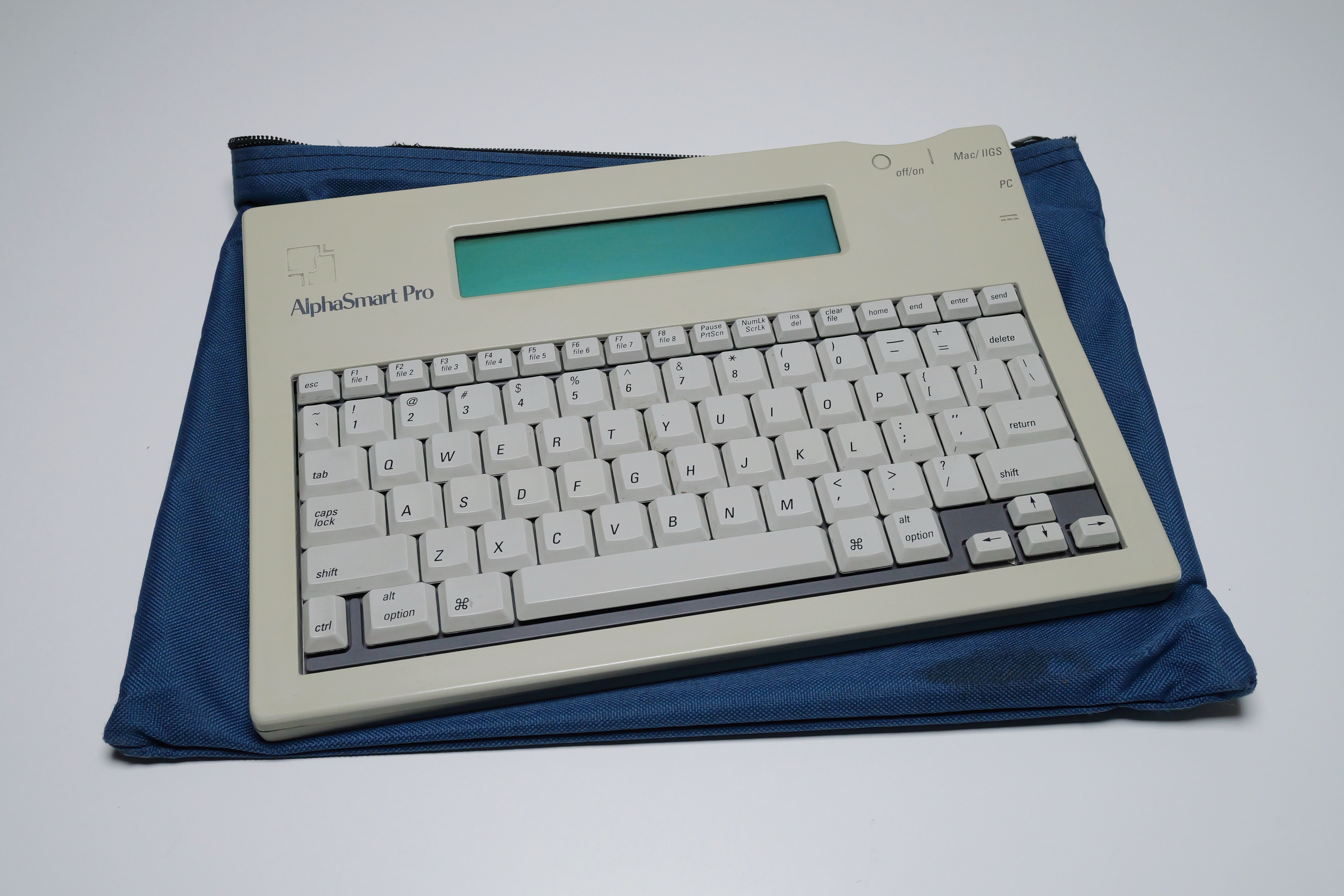
AlphaSmart Pro

In February 1995, the AlphaSmart Pro was launched. This looked almost identical to the original but had a PS/2 port as well as an ADB port, making it compatible with both Windows PCs and Apple IIGS and Macintoshes. It was able to receive text from a computer through "Get Utility" software installed on a Mac or Windows PC, and was able to store up to 64 pages of text (128,000 bytes), holding 16 pages in the first file, 8 pages in files two through five, 6 in files six and seven, and 4 pages in file number eight. The original rechargeable NiCad battery pack could also be used in the Pro model.

==== AlphaSmart 2000 ====
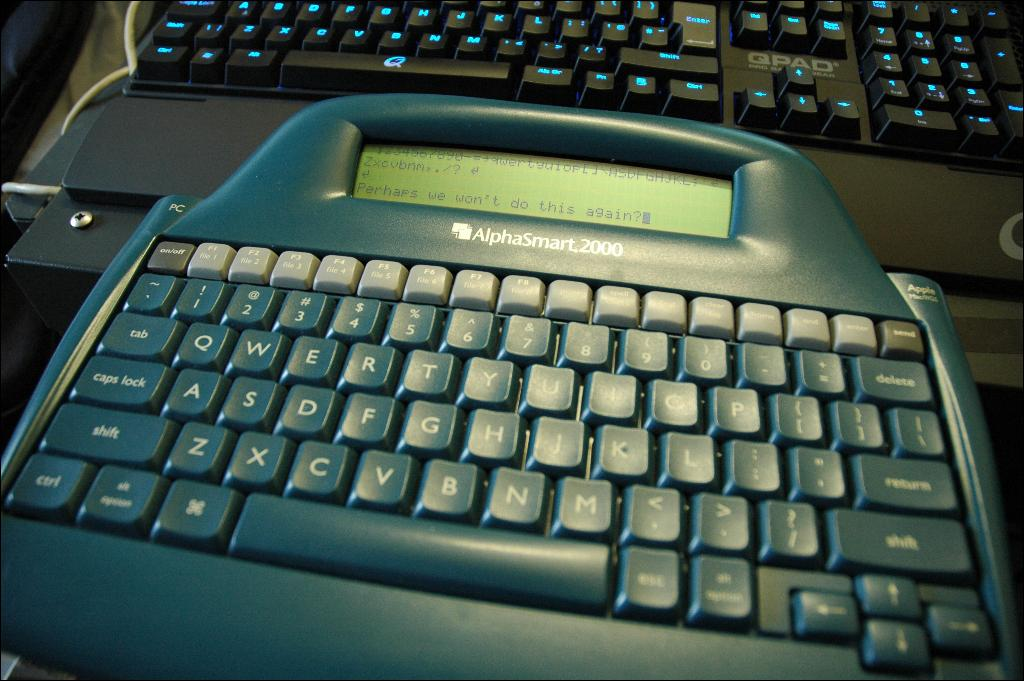
AlphaSmart 2000

In October 1997, AlphaSmart introduced the third generation of the AlphaSmart family, the AlphaSmart 2000. Along with a more ergonomic design, the case of the AlphaSmart 2000 was curvy and blue. New features added were spell-checking, direct printing (allowing a user to plug into a printer directly, bypassing a computer), auto-off power save, and a keyboarding timer. A year later, the company added infrared capability to the 2000, enabling users to transfer text to a computer or another AlphaSmart without a cable. This model needed 3 AA batteries, but could still use the original rechargeable NiCad battery pack. Like the AlphaSmart Pro, it had a 128 kB memory.

==== AlphaSmart 3000 ====
AlphaSmart 3000

In January 2000, the AlphaSmart 3000 was released. The 3000 used the same chassis as the AlphaSmart 2000, but it was now encased in translucent bondi-blue plastic, matching Apple Computer's first generation iMac. This was meant to be a visual indication that the AlphaSmart 3000 was a USB native device, as many other USB devices were patterned using the iMac's design in the same way.

Designers removed the ADB and PS/2 ports, replacing them with a USB port and a mini-DIN-8 serial port. Also new was the SmartApplet architecture that was capable of extending the simple functionality of an AlphaSmart with the inclusion of SmartApplets—miniature software applications that extend the AlphaSmart's functionality to give it features beyond basic word processing. For example, it included a simple 5-function calculator. Additionally, the battery life and memory were increased (although it still ran on 3 AA batteries), and cut/copy/paste functions were introduced. The original rechargeable NiCad battery pack was not compatible with this model. Instead, it used a new optional nickel metal hydride battery (NiMH) pack that lasted longer and eliminated the memory effect of NiCad batteries. The AlphaSmart 3000 had the customary 8 files, each with a capacity of 12.5 pages (about 25 kilobytes), for a total of 100 pages altogether.

AlphaSmart announced the discontinuation of the AlphaSmart on April 30, 2006.

=== Dana ===
Dana, Dana Wireless
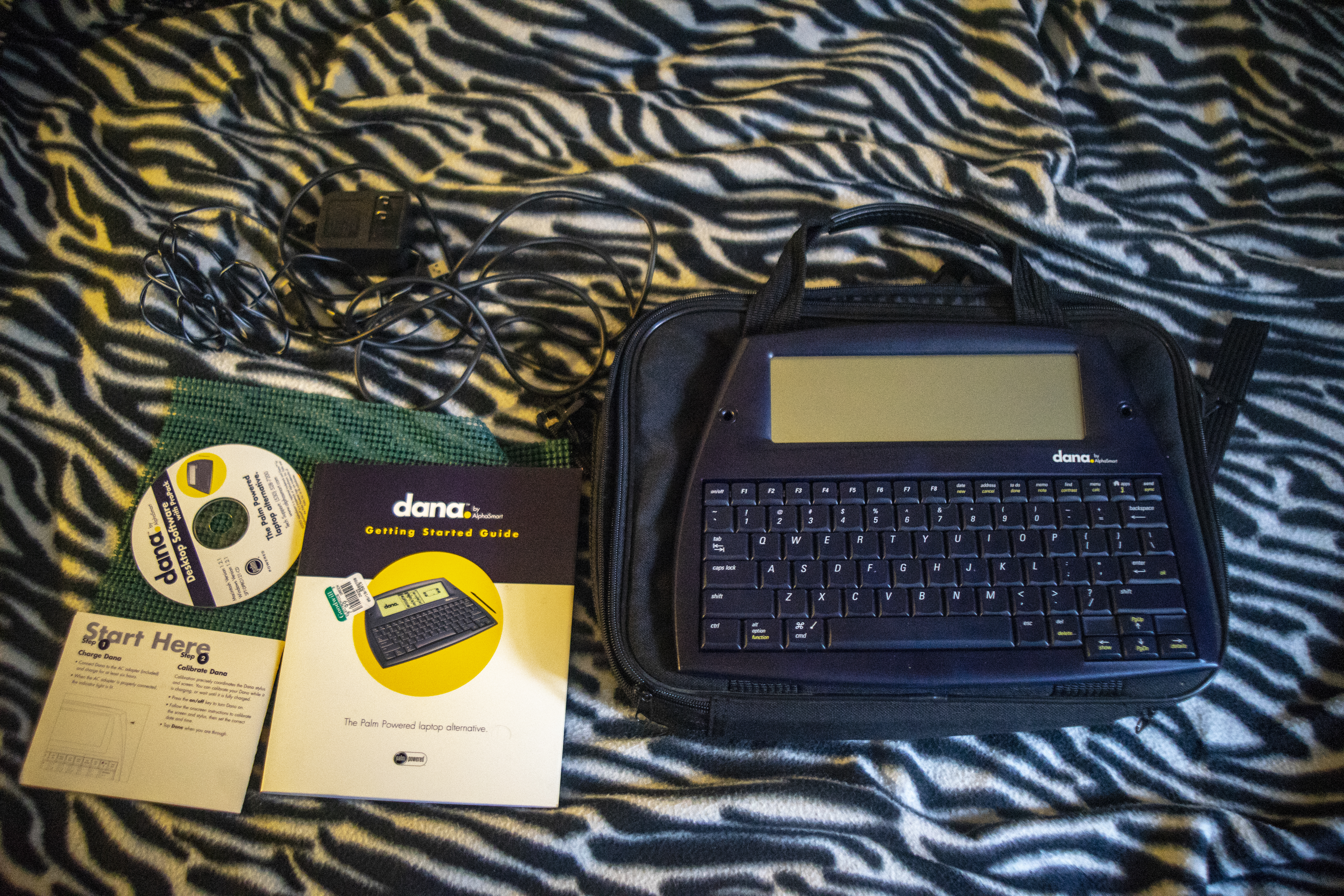
- Manufacturer: AlphaSmart
- Type: Portable computer
- Operating system: Palm OS 4.1.2
- CPU: Motorola DragonBall VZ @ 33 MHz
- Storage: 8 MiB (Dana (First Revision) or 16 MiB (Dana (Second Revision) and Dana Wireless) internal RAM
- Removable storage: two SD card slots
- Display: 560×160 pixels, 4 (Dana (First revision)) and 16 (Dana (Second revision) and Dana Wireless) shade greyscale
- Input: full-sized keyboard Touchscreen
- Touchpad: Entire screen
- Connectivity: Infrared, USB master, USB slave, Dana Wireless adds Wi-Fi, SDIO
- Power: 3.6V NiMH battery pack or 3 AA batteries or mains power adapter
- Dimensions: 1.9 in × 12.4 in × 9.3 in (4.8 cm × 31.5 cm × 23.6 cm)
- Weight: 2.0 lb (0.91 kg)
- Predecessor: AlphaSmart 3000
- Successor: Neo

In June 2002, AlphaSmart released the Dana, which is a radical departure from their standard product line. Similar to Apple Computer's 1997 Newton eMate 300 (a laptop running Newton OS), the Dana, FCC ID KV2DANA001, is a full-fledged Palm OS Version 4 device complete with a touch-screen, allowing a user to write directly on the screen via Graffiti in addition to typing on its built-in, full-size keyboard. It has 8 or 16 mebibytes (MiB) of storage and two expansion slots for cards in Secure Digital (SD) or Multimedia Card formats. Dana runs nearly every Palm OS program for version 4.x or earlier.

The Dana's touch screen is extra wide with a resolution of 560 × 160 pixels. This is 3.5 times the normal width of Palm handheld PDAs. Some Palm OS programs can make use of the entire screen width, including the standard Palm OS apps Memo Pad, Datebook, Todo and Address Book. Those that cannot run inside a central 160- by 160-pixel window. The Dana's screen has a backlight and is capable of displaying complex graphics (though only in 4-bit grayscale), unlike the original AlphaSmart line. The screen can be used in either landscape mode or portrait mode, though there is no auto-detection of how the Dana is positioned; the user has to tap a menu selection to choose the mode. Larger fonts and boldface fonts can be selected from within Alphawrite (see below) to compensate for the low-contrast screen display's being somewhat difficult to read.

The Dana's primary software is the built-in Alphawrite word processor. This is a licensed version of Wordsmith for Palm OS by Blue Nomad, customized for the Dana's wider screen. Up to eight Alphawrite documents can be resident at one time, each instantly accessible via the Dana's eight function keys. Any number of Alphawrite documents are accessible via the File menu, up to the limit of the computer's memory. Also, it is simple to switch between the Alphawrite documents and any of the four built-in apps native to Palm OS (Memo Pad, Datebook, Todo, Address Book).

The screen is physically taller than that of the original AlphaSmart products, and the Dana's casing is made from opaque dark-blue plastic—a change from the iMac-esque clear blue of the AlphaSmart 3000. It uses either a NiMH rechargeable battery or 3 AA batteries for up to 25 hours of usage. Its AC adapter is rated at 7.5 VDC, center negative, 1000 mA.

Danas produced near the end of its production run were modified because many users complained that their Danas were frequently turning themselves on when carried in a container, such as a backpack, depleting the battery charge. This was because the on-off switch was getting depressed and switching the device on. Version 1.5 of the Dana OS provided a way to require both the Enter and On/Off keys to power it up, making it less likely that both keys would be depressed accidentally. This is accessed through the system Keyboard App.

The Dana has an IrDA-compatible infrared port for transferring (or "beaming") documents and files. This is a convenient way to back up files to another Dana or an IrDA-equipped PC. Being a Palm OS computer, files may be transferred to or from a PC over the USB port using the Hotsync feature of the included Palm Desktop software. This is also how third-party programs are loaded into the Dana. Another use for the USB port is to trickle-charge a rechargeable battery pack, in lieu of the AC adapter.

==== Dana Wireless ====
One year later, in 2003, AlphaSmart added the Dana Wireless model (FCC ID KV2DANA002), which added built-in Wi-Fi connectivity for internet use and interaction with other Danas, doubled the RAM capacity from 8 MiB to 16 MiB, doubled flash ROM from 4 MiB to 8 MiB, quadrupled the number of shades of gray displayed from 4 to 16, and added SDIO support to the SD card slots. It used 3 AA batteries (standard, NiMH, or NiCad) for up to 20 hours of usage.

=== Neo ===
The Neo model was introduced in August 2004 and could hold more than 200 pages of text. Its LCD was 50% larger than the AlphaSmart 3000's display. Unlike the 3000, it did not use fixed blocks for each character and, therefore, could display different font/point sizes, along with simple graphics. The Neo also ran a newer operating system that allowed for modular control of SmartApplets and a new version of AlphaWord (the word-processing SmartApplet), which allowed dynamic file resizing. The CPU was a 33 MHz DragonBall VZ, which is a 68000-based processor made by Freescale/Motorola. The Neo's chassis was a dark opaque shade of green with its form factor based on the Dana. It used the same optional NiMH battery pack as the AlphaSmart Dana. Initially, the Neo had several software bugs, such as a hard-to-see cursor and a text-stacking file corruption problem.

In 2007, the Neo 2 added several minor upgrades to the original Neo and was the first unit released after AlphaSmart was acquired by Renaissance Learning. It added quiz functionality, using the 2Know! Toolbar, which was developed for the 2Know! Classroom Response System. Teachers could create, distribute, and score quizzes using the Neo 2. Neo 2 could also access Accelerated Reader quizzes and allow students to use network printers, when using the Renaissance Receiver accessory.

Both the Neo and Neo 2 were discontinued by Renaissance Learning in late September 2013, although the company still offers support and software to existing users as of March 2014.

== See also ==
- Astrohaus
