= Micom =

Telecommunication equipment company, known for concentrators

Micom Systems, Inc., was a manufacturer of telecommunications equipment, best known for their line of concentrators. The company was founded by serial entrepreneur Stephen Bernard Dorsey in 1975 and sold to Philips NV in 1984. Micom acquired Spectrum Digital Corporation in 1987.

== Concentrators ==
Micom became known for its ads, often run on the back pages of popular-in-their-day computer industry publications, with the slogan "Concentrate. Because it's cheaper!" The initial ads showed oranges and what resembled a can of frozen orange juice, with a "brand name" of Micom. After adding variations, they began advertising on television. The focus of the ads, within their telecommunications products, was their line of concentrators.

Their print ads included the trademarked phrase "MICOM: MicroComputers for DataCommunications"
