= Flocabulary =

US educational company

- Type: Curriculum based websites
- Founded: 2004
- Founder: Blake Harrison, Alex Rappaport
- Headquarters: Brooklyn, New York
- Owner: Nearpod
- Website: flocabulary.com

Flocabulary is a Brooklyn-based company that creates educational hip hop songs, videos and additional materials for students in grades K-12. Founded in 2004 by Blake Harrison and Alex Rappaport, the company takes a nontraditional approach to teaching vocabulary, United States history, math, science and other subjects by integrating content into recorded raps. Flocabulary's website features videos, lesson plans, activities and assessments. The company's name is a portmanteau of "flow" and "vocabulary".

The company has emphasized outreach to underprivileged schools in its business decisions. As of 2015, more than 35,000 schools use Flocabulary products in the classroom. Flocabulary has been praised by rapper Snoop Dogg, United Nations Secretary General Ban Ki-moon, and historian Howard Zinn, and the company's products have been generally well received by educators and the press. However, the project has been criticized for perceived cultural inauthenticity and politically charged material in some song lyrics.

== History ==
Blake Harrison conceived of the idea that would become Flocabulary while in high school. Inspired by hip hop artists like Outkast and A Tribe Called Quest, Harrison wanted to combine the easy retainability of hip hop lyrics with educational content. Harrison graduated from the University of Pennsylvania with a degree in English. He then moved to San Francisco, where he met Alex Rappaport, a music graduate of Tufts University. Harrison shared his idea with Rappaport, and in 2004 the two made a demo recording of two songs with a combined total of 80 SAT words. Within two months Sparknotes made the songs available for free streaming, and soon afterward Harrison and Rappaport set up a Flocabulary website. Cider Mill Press published Flocabulary books and distributed them through Sterling Publishing to sell the book at Barnes & Noble and Borders stores. The Hip Hop Approach to SAT Vocabulary sold 10,000 copies in its first year of publication and was reprinted five times. In 2005, Flocabulary went on a promotional tour of concerts at schools.

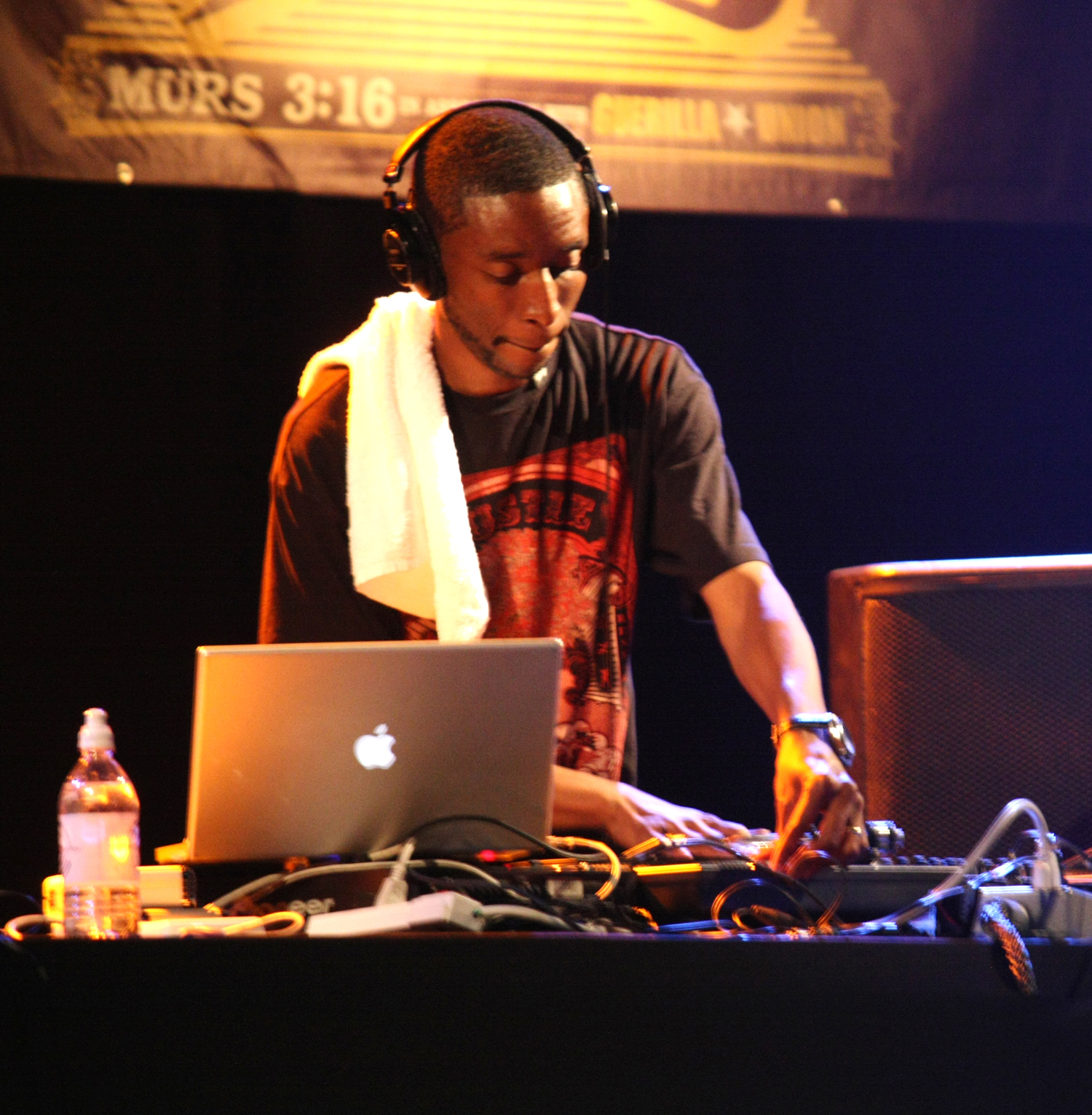
9th Wonder, pictured performing live in 2008, collaborated with Flocabulary on Shakespeare Is Hip-Hop.

By early 2006, Flocabulary began self-publishing its products. Harrison and Rappaport raised $50,000 from family and friends and began visiting schools and education conferences to sell their products. Flocabulary entered into a contest for startup businesses at Columbia Business School and won a social value award. After participating in a collaborative business advice program with Columbia students, Harrison and Rappaport decided to stop self-publishing and returned to Cider Mill. Flocabulary raised $110,000 from investors and hired 30 sales representatives. In September 2007, a line of Flocabulary products was released called "Word Up" for teaching standardized test vocabulary.

Word Up! proved successful and helped to double their annual revenue in 2008 to $600,000. Flocabulary's 2007 release Shakespeare Is Hip-Hop featured musical and lyrical contributions from a number of hip hop artists, including Grammy Award-winner 9th Wonder. In 2008, Harrison and Rappaport created The Week in Rap, a weekly series of songs that has covered current events including the 2008 presidential election and the results of California Proposition 8. By 2009, Flocabulary made $900,000 in annual revenue.

Rappaport says that Flocabulary has made access to its products a priority over profitability, saying, "We wanted to reach the kids who might never get to the SATs, whose families weren't buying books at Barnes & Noble." According to Rappaport, Flocabulary has made "social responsibility a core value [of the company] and never [let] it get overshadowed by our revenue goals," and, "we're trying to make this as affordable as possible, because unfortunately the schools with money aren't necessarily the schools that need Flocabulary. So we're trying to work with some government organizations and other charities to really get these into the schools that need them." Flocabulary's non-profitable social projects have included charitable donations and outreach to underprivileged schools. In 2016, Flocabulary partnered with the United Nations to produce a video promoting the U.N.'s Sustainable Development Goals for improving the world by 2030.

In September 2010, the use of Flocabulary was postponed in Oklahoma City Public Schools after several teachers voiced concern over some of the lyrics in the program. The lyrics to the song "Old Dead White Men" drew complaints about referring to the Founding Fathers of the United States as dead white males, a term used to criticize perceived disproportionate emphasis on the contributions of historical European males. The lyrics to "O.D.W.M." also compare Andrew Jackson's policy of Indian removal to Adolf Hitler's Final Solution. Rappaport responded that the materials were meant to keep the students engaged and promote discussion, but the company has since replaced the song on its site. Tucker Carlson said Flocabulary was a "get-educated-quick [scheme]" that disregards historical "context or accuracy", and said "there are still no independent studies that demonstrate rapping about social studies is any more educational than rapping about sex or gunfights."

By June 2016, when Flocabulary raised a $1.5 million convertible note from Rethink Education, the company had produced more than 725 educational rap videos. Atlanta Public Schools partnered with Flocabulary in 2016 for a series of history rap battles where students wrote and performed their own rhymes about historical figures inspired by Flocabulary and the Broadway musical Hamilton.

== Reception ==
School Library Journal notes that, "[Flocabulary's] catchy songs hook K-12 students in a way that textbooks can't." A reporter for The Wall Street Journal visited classrooms where Flocabulary was being used and remarked that, "When third-grade teachers asked questions about the videos and vocabulary, the problem wasn’t getting children to raise their hands, but to put them down." A reporter for FastCompany writes that "As a lesson supplement, it gets the job done —not every memory tool inspires comments like "JAMMIN" on YouTube." BuzzFeed called a series of Flocabulary videos created for Black History Month, "the coolest way to teach." Academics Howard Zinn and Cornel West endorsed Hip-Hop U.S. History. Menchville High reported that use of Flocabulary increased SAT scores from 420 to 477, though the principal said the school can't verify to what extent Flocabulary did or didn't have an influence. A study conducted across six US states by former International Reading Association president Roger Farr demonstrated improvement in reading and writing skills among middle schools students who studied with Flocabulary. Proficiency increased by more than 20 percent. Snoop Dogg has expressed support for the company's products. When Flocabulary artists Ike Ramos and Nitty Scott performed at the United Nations for the International Day of Peace, U.N. Secretary General Ban Ki-moon praised the performance as "genius."

Jack Rosenthal of The New York Times says that Flocabulary is "one example of how Web sites have latched onto mnemonics as ways to teach SAT words to high-school students." In November 2014, Entrepreneur.com reporter Laura Entis called a video about credit cards in Flocabulary's financial literacy series “direct, clear and insanely catchy.” Common Sense Media notes that, "One of Flocabulary's best qualities is that the songs sound like real rap songs, not an embarrassing facsimile that's obviously for educational purposes. The backing beats and samples are catchy and memorable, and videos contain a fun combo of stock footage, original animation, and, for The Week in Rap, current news clips." In the book Slam School: Learning Through Conflict in the Hip-Hop and Spoken Word Classroom Bronwen Low, while praising Flocabulary and similar programs for incorporating hip hop into American schools, argues that Flocabulary is culturally inauthentic and refers to Flocabulary's methods as a gimmick. Similarly, while the book The Anthology of Rap supports Shakespeare Is Hip Hop as an "effective and entertaining [tool]", the author said Flocabulary failed to "illuminate rap's distinct poetic tradition."
