= Friden Flexowriter =

Teleprinter

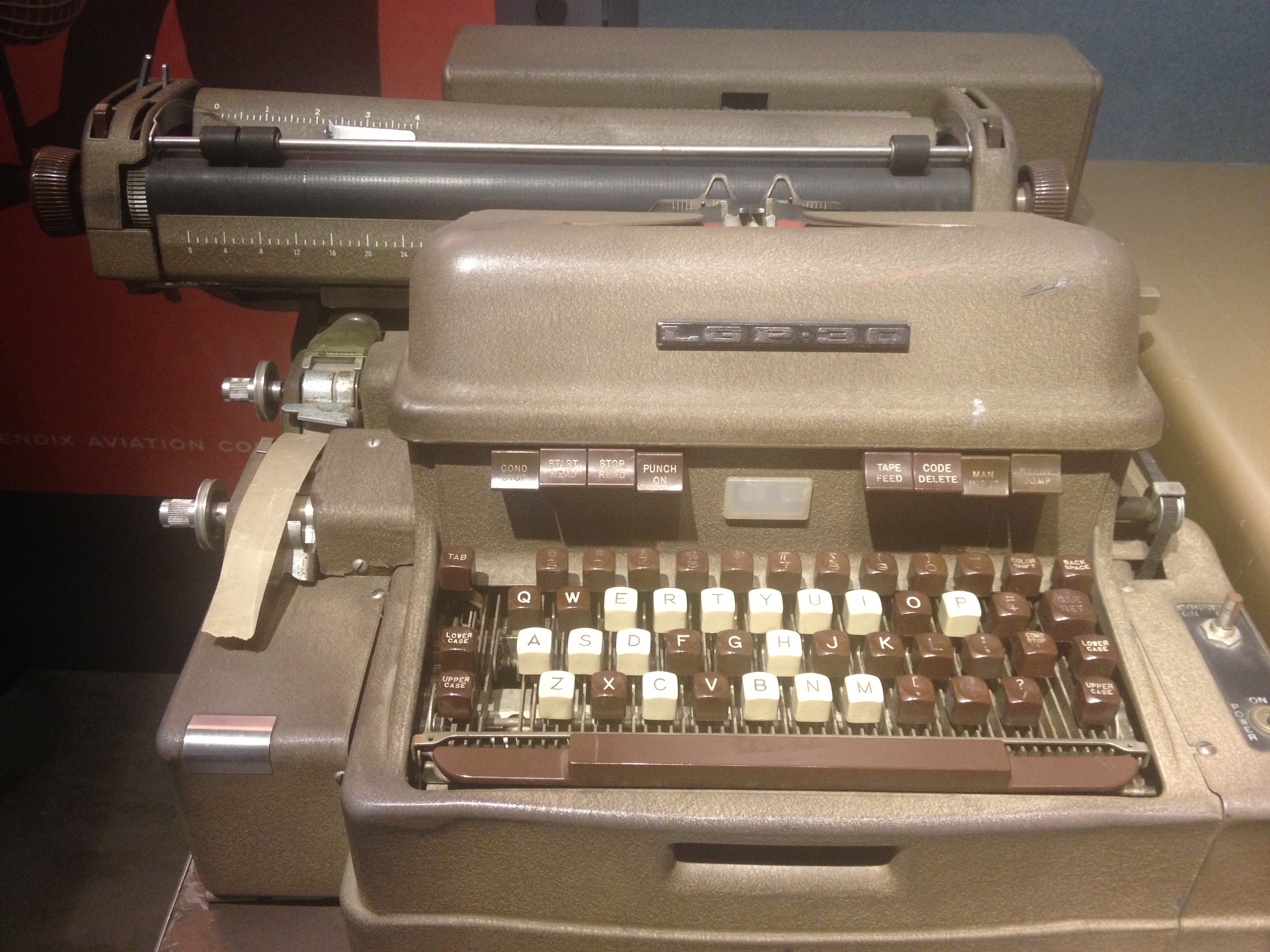
Friden Flexowriter used as a console typewriter for the LGP-30 computer on display at the Computer History Museum

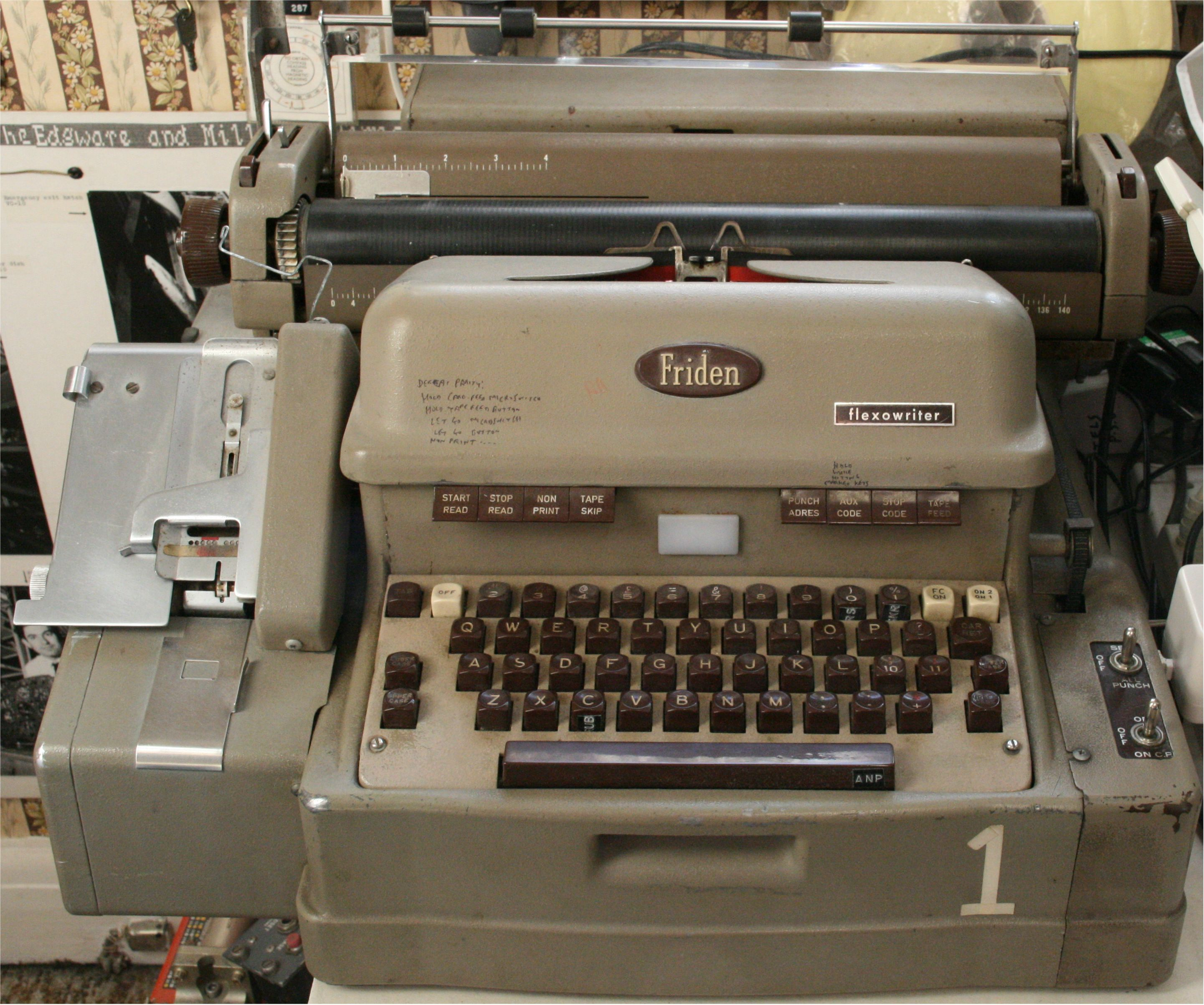
Model 1 SPD (Systems Programatic Double-case) equipped for edge-punched cards; most Flexowriters had paper-tape readers and punches.

The Friden Flexowriter was a teleprinter that was produced by the Friden Calculating Machine Company. It was a heavy-duty electric typewriter capable of being driven not only by a human typing, but also automatically by several methods, including direct attachment to a computer and by use of paper tape.

Elements of the design date back to the 1920s, and variants of the machine were produced until the early 1970s; the machines found a variety of uses during the evolution of office equipment in the 20th century, including being among the first electric typewriters, computer input and output devices, forerunners of modern word processing, and also having roles in the machine tool and printing industries.

== History ==
=== Origins and early history ===
The Electromatic typewriter patents document the use of pivoted spiral cams operating against a hard rubber drive roller to drive the print mechanism. This was the foundation of essentially all later electric typewriters. The typewriter could be equipped with a "remote control" mechanism allowing one typewriter to control another or to record and play back typed data through a parallel data connection with one wire per typewriter key. The Electromatic tape perforator used a wide tape, with punch position per key on the keyboard.

In 1933, IBM wanted to enter the electric typewriter market, and purchased the Electromatic Corporation, renaming the typewriter the IBM Model 01, and continuing to use the Electromatic trademark.

IBM experimented with several accessories and enhancements for its electric typewriter. In 1942, IBM filed a patent application for a typewriter that could print justified and proportionally spaced text. This required recording each line of text on a paper tape before it was printed. IBM experimented with a 12-hole paper tape compatible with their punched-card code. Eventually, IBM settled on a six-hole encoding, as documented in their automatic justifying typewriter patents filed in 1945.

=== Postwar ===
In 1950, Edwin O. Blodgett filed a patent application on behalf of Commercial Controls Corporation for a "tape controlled typewriter". This machine used a six-level punched paper tape, and was the basis for the machines CCC and Friden built over the next 15 years.

=== End of product line ===
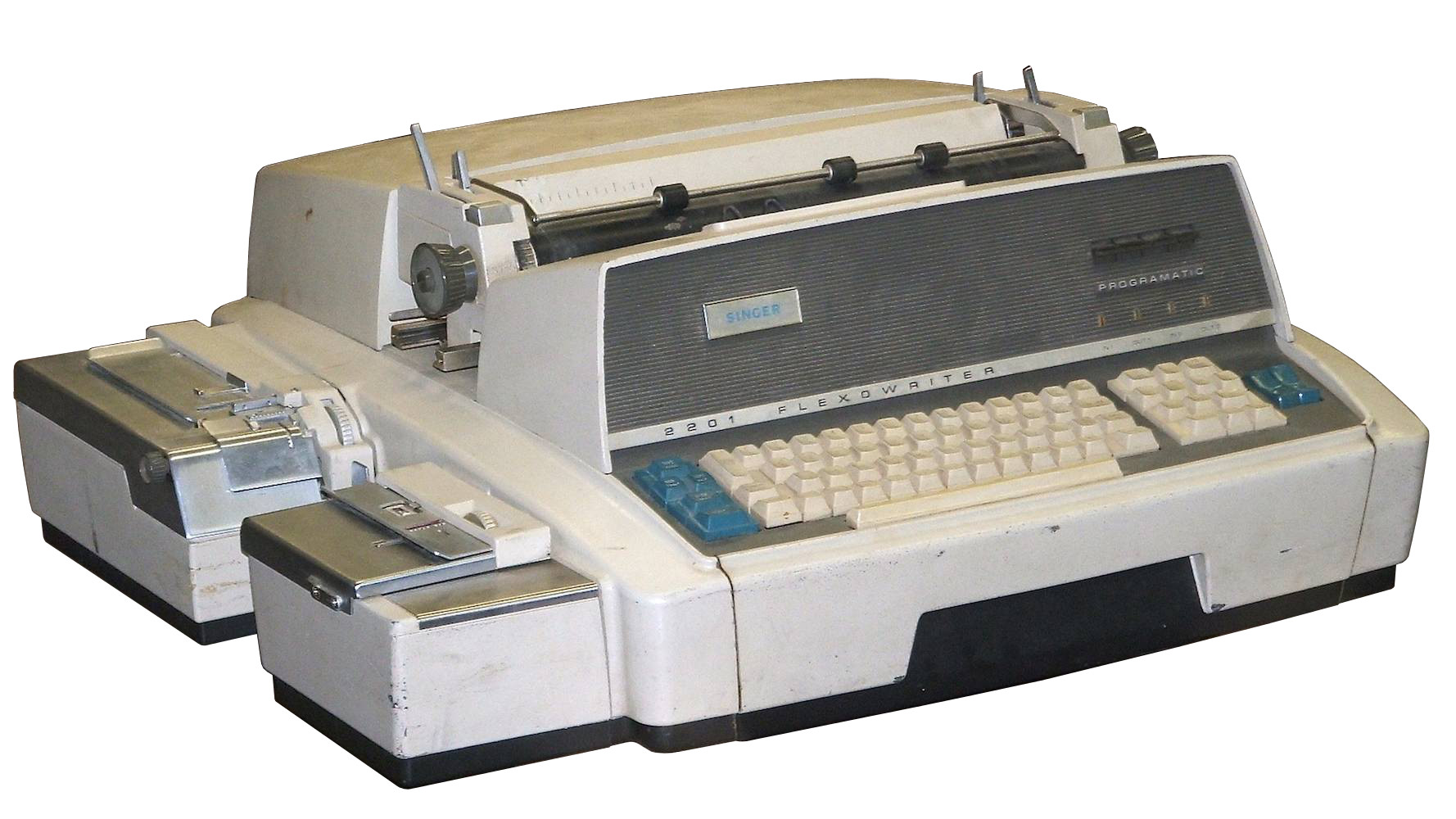
The Model 2201 Programatic

There was a major redesign of the Flexowriter in the mid 1960s. The Model 2201 Programatic, introduced in 1965, had a sleek modern styling and 13 programmable function keys. This was the first major change in appearance of Flexowriters in nearly forty years. Programming was done using a 320-contact plugboard, and all of the logic was implemented using relays. The case, although modern looking, was entirely metal, giving the machine a shipping weight of 132 pounds (60 kg). The selling price was £2900 (British pounds).

Although primarily sold as a stand-alone word processor (a term not yet in use at the time), Friden also sold it with a communications option allowing it to be used as a computer terminal. Members of the 2200 family operated at 135 words per minute (11.3 characters per second). The family also included the 2210 and 2211, on which the function keys were replaced with a numeric keypad, and the 2261, using ASCII instead of the proprietary eight-bit code used by other members of the 2200 family.

The 2300 series were cosmetically similar to the 2200 series, although without the function keys or numeric keypad, with a simplified plugboard, and operating at 145 words per minute (12 characters per second). In addition to the basic 2301, the 2302 supported the auxiliary tape readers and punches from the 2200 family. The 2304 offered proportional spacing and a carbon ribbon mechanism, making it suitable for preparing camera-ready copy. The base price for the 2300 family was £1400 (British pounds).

Sales and innovation declined. In the late 1960s, the market for word processing equipment was shifting to magnetic media. IBM introduced the Magnetic Tape Selectric Typewriter (MT/ST) in 1964. In October, 1968, Information Control Systems introduced the Astrotype word processing system. Both of these used magnetic tape and Selectric print mechanisms. With its fixed type font and paper-tape recording medium, the Flexowriter had difficulty competing with these machines, although some Flexowriter documentation emphasized the fact that, unlike IBM's MT/ST tapes, Flexowriter users could cut and splice paper tapes, particularly if they could recognize some of the common codes such as carriage return.

== Applications ==
=== Automatic typewriters ===
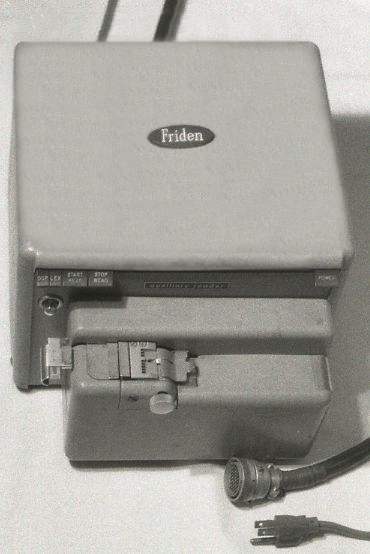
Friden auxiliary paper-tape reader for six-level paper tape

From its earliest days through to at least the mid-1960s, Flexowriters were used as automatic letter writers.

=== Console terminals ===
As the unit record equipment (tabulating machine) industry matured and became the computer industry, Flexowriters were commonly used as console terminals for computers. Because ASCII character coding had not yet been standardized, each type of computer tended to use its own system for encoding characters; Flexowriters were capable of being configured with numerous encodings particular to the computer system the machine was being used with.

Computers that used Flexowriters as consoles include:

- The Electromatic on the Harvard Mark I
- The MIT Whirlwind I computer, first designed to control a flight simulator, and later becoming the basis of the SAGE network.
- The Lincoln Laboratory TX-0, an early experimental transistor-based minicomputer, which was to be a seminal influence on hacker culture at MIT in the late 1950s prior to the introduction of the PDP-1.
- The BMEWS DIP computer, NORAD Combat Operations Center (COC), Colorado Springs, Colo., beginning in 1960. Tape code was essentially base-32.
- Electrodata 205. ElectroData was purchased by the Burroughs Corporation, and many later Burroughs machines also used Flexowriters
- The Librascope LGP-30 and LGP-21
- The Packard Bell PB 250
- The SEA CAB 500
- The ALWAC III-E
- The English Electric KDF9
- SWAC (Standards Western Automatic Computer), where a separate Flexowriter was used for input, and another one for output (visible left and right sides of this picture: SWAC (computer)#/media/File:SWAC 001.jpg).

The Whirlwind I deployment in 1955 is notable as it seems to have been the first time that a typewriter-like input device was directly connected to a general-purpose electronic computer, becoming directly ancestral to today's computer keyboards.
