= What Works Clearinghouse =

Digital library of educational research

What Works Clearinghouse (WWC) is a digital library of educational research which focuses on evidence-based education.

A 2006 report described that many researchers perceived the WWC to be passive cataloger of available research. In contrast to that view, the paper described a series of opinionated subjective decisions which the WWC made about providing some educational research and declining to index another sort.

WWC was established in 2002 as a project of the Institute of Education Sciences.

The WWC recommendations for interpreting the results of single-case educational studies is the subject of discussion.

The WWC has systems for evaluating the effectiveness of educational research in general and curricula.

Various researchers use WWC itself as the platform through which they access other research.

Some of the concerns expressed about WWC are that it appears to have difficulty keeping up with the research so it may not be current; and when a program is not listed on their database, it may be that it did not meet their criteria or they have not yet reviewed it, but it's not clear which. In addition Straight Talk on Evidence, authored by the Arnold Ventures LLC’ Evidence-Based Policy team, on January 16, 2018 expressed concerns about the validity of the ratings provided by WWC. It says WWC in some cases reported a "preliminary outcome when high-quality RCTs found no significant effects on more important and final educational outcomes".
