= Stephen Bernard Dorsey =

Stephen Bernard Dorsey is a serial entrepreneur who founded several companies, two of which, he built into international leaders among manufacturers of word processors. He currently is the CEO of babyTEL, an Internet Telephony Service Provider.

== Biography ==
Dorsey was born in Montreal, Quebec, on July 10, 1937 and is a Massachusetts Institute of Technology-trained engineer.

His son Dan Dorsey, as part of his preparation to film a video about his father, made a March 2017 visit to an exhibit at The Personal Computer Museum by curator Syd Bolton that focused on MICOM.

He died on August 25, 2020.

== Career ==
In 1967, Dorsey founded AES Data Inc. in Montreal, developing industrial remote-control applications. In 1972, AES launched the AES 90 computer, years before Microsoft and Apple were companies. Marketed as a "word processing system," the AES 90 was really the world's first general-purpose personal computer. AES went on to grow to more than $200 million in annual sales. The Word Processor was the precursor to Microsoft Word, Apple and other software based business applications.

Dorsey launched his next venture, Micom Co., after selling his stake in AES in 1975, again selling word processing and office automation systems, but adding telecommunications equipment. Having directed Micom to $200 million in revenue, Dorsey sold it to Philips NV in 1984 and founded Voice & Data Systems in 1991.

== Micom concentrators ==
Micom became known for its ads, often run on the back pages of popular-in-their-day computer industry publications, with the slogan "Concentrate. Because it's cheaper!" The initial ads showed oranges and what resembled a can of frozen orange juice, with a "brand name" of Micom. After adding variations, they began advertising on television. The focus of the ads, within their telecommunications products, was their line of Concentrators.

Their print ads included the trademarked phrase "MICOM: MicroComputers for DataCommunications"
