= Accelerated Reader =

Educational software

- Developer: Renaissance Learning
- Release: 1986; 40 years ago
- Operating system: Windows, macOS
- Type: Educational
- Website: www.renaissance.com/products/accelerated-reader/

Accelerated Reader (AR) is an educational program created by Renaissance Learning. It is designed to monitor and manage students' independent reading practice and comprehension in both English and Spanish. The program assesses students' performance through quizzes and tests based on the books they have read. As the students read and take quizzes, they are awarded points. AR monitors students' progress and establishes personalised reading goals according to their reading levels.

== Components ==
=== ATOS ===
ATOS is a readability formula designed by Renaissance Learning.

Books with quizzes in Accelerated Reader are assigned an ATOS readability level. This ATOS score is used by AR in combination with a book length to assign a point value to each book. It can also be used by students to help choose books of appropriate reading levels.

=== Quiz ===
Accelerated (going up to 7th grade) Reader (AR) quizzes are available on fiction and non-fiction books, textbooks, supplemental materials, and magazines. Most are in the form of reading practice quizzes although, some are curriculum-based with multiple subjects.

Many of the company's quizzes are available in an optional recorded voice format for primary-level book in which the quiz questions and answers are read to the student taking the quiz. These quizzes are designed to help emerge English and Spanish readers to take the quizzes without additional assistance.

The Renaissance Place version of Accelerated Reader also includes quizzes designed to practice vocabulary. The quizzes use words from books, and are taken after the book has been read. Bookmarks can be printed out to display the vocabulary words so that as students read, they can refer to the bookmark for help. The quizzes will keep track of the words learned.

=== Reports ===
- Reports are generated on demand to help students, teachers, and parents monitor student progress. Reports are available regarding student reading, comprehension, amount of reading, diagnostic information, and other variables. Customizable reports available in the Renaissance Place edition can also report district-level information.

The TOPS Report (The Opportunity to Praise Students) reports quiz results after each quiz is taken. Diagnostic Reports identify students in need of intervention based on various factors. The Student Record Report is a complete record of the books the student has read.

== Evaluation research ==
A number of studies have been conducted regarding the effectiveness of using Accelerated Reader in the classroom. The following two studies were reviewed by the What Works Clearinghouse and were found to meet their research standards.

In a study conducted in Memphis, Tennessee, 1,665 students and 76 teachers from 12 schools (grades K-8) were surveyed. The study involved randomly selecting some teachers to implement the Accelerated Reader software, while others continued with the regular curriculum without the software. The results indicated that students in classrooms utilising the Accelerated Reader program showed academic gains.

In another study, Nunnery, Ross, and McDonald evaluated the reading achievement of students in grades 3–8. They examined the impact of individual, classroom, and school factors on reading achievement. The findings revealed that students in classrooms using the Accelerated Reader program outperformed those in control classrooms. Additionally, students with learning disabilities in classrooms with high levels of Accelerated Reader implementation showed better performance compared to similar students in classrooms with low or no implementation.

=== Other evaluations ===
In a controlled evaluation, Holmes and Brown found that two schools using the School Renaissance program achieved statistically significantly higher standardized test scores compared with two comparison schools that only used the Renaissance program in a limited way. Because so many schools in the United States are using Accelerated Reader, it was difficult for the authors of this study to find two schools in Georgia that were not already using Accelerated Reader. The authors noted:

In all nine comparisons involving standardized test scores in reading, language arts, and mathematics, the Renaissance schools' children outperformed the contrast school's children. It can only be concluded that the Renaissance program was highly effective in raising the performance of these elementary students.

—

In 2003, Samuels and Wu found that after six months, third and fifth grade students who used Accelerated Reader demonstrated twice the gain in reading comprehension as those that did not use Accelerated Reader. The comparison students completed book reports suggesting that delayed feedback through book reports is not as useful as the immediate feedback provided by Accelerated Reader. In another study that controlled for the amount of time spent reading each day, Samuels and Wu found that students in Accelerated Reader classrooms at a Minnesota elementary school outperformed students in control classrooms.

Researcher Keith Topping completed many studies on Accelerated Reader that found the software to be an effective assessment for deciding curriculum.

=== Criticism ===
Renaissance Learning, the developer of Accelerated Reader, has outlined the primary purpose of the program as an assessment tool to gauge whether students have read a book, not to assess higher-order thinking skills, to teach or otherwise replace curriculum, to supersede the role of the teacher, or to provide an extrinsic reward. Educator Jim Trelease however, describes Accelerated Reader, along with Scholastic's Reading Counts!, as "reading incentive software" in an article exploring the pros and cons of the two software packages. Stephen D. Krashen, in a 2003 literature review, also asserts that reading incentives is one of the aspects of Accelerated Reader. He reiterates prior research stating that reading for incentives does not create long-term readers.

Renaissance Place does include recognizing setting and understanding sequence as examples of higher-order thinking. Turner and Paris's study explore the role of classroom literacy tasks in which students take end-of-book tests called Reading Practice Quizzes that are composed of literal-recall questions to which there is only one answer. Turner and Paris would classify these quizzes as "closed tasks." They concluded that open-ended tasks are more supportive of literacy growth in the future.

Florida Center for Reading Research, citing two studies that support the product, noted both the lack of available books in a school's library and the lack of assessment of "inferential or critical thinking skills" as weaknesses of the software. Their guide also noted a number of strengths of the software, including its ability to motivate students and provide immediate results on student's reading habits and progress.

Use of the program has been criticized by Scholastic as preventing children from reading from a variety of difficulty levels. A PowerPoint from Scholastic made in 2006 indicates that 39% of children between the ages of five and ten have read a Harry Potter novel with 68% of students in that age range having an interest in reading or re-reading a Harry Potter book. For example, the ATOS reading level of Harry Potter and the Philosopher's Stone is 5.5 (with ATOS numbers corresponding to grade levels). This would indicate that students below that grade range may not be able to read and comprehend the book. Since teachers, parents and students use readability levels to select books, this may discourage students from reading the book as the student is under pressure to earn Accelerated Reader points during the school year. Although, students can take tests and earn points for books at any ATOS level.
