= Educational evaluation =

Educational evaluation is the evaluation process of characterizing and appraising some aspect/s of an educational process.

Two common purposes of educational evaluation sometimes conflict with one another. Educational institutions usually require evaluation data to demonstrate effectiveness to funders and other stakeholders, and to provide a measure of performance for marketing purposes. Educational evaluation is also a professional activity that individual educators need to undertake if they intend to continuously review and enhance the learning they are endeavoring to facilitate.

== Purpose for educational evaluation ==
The Joint Committee on Standards for Educational Evaluation published three sets of standards for educational evaluations. The Personnel Evaluation Standards was published in 1988, The Program Evaluation Standards (2nd edition) was published in 1994, and The Student Evaluations Standards was published in 2003.

== See also ==
- Academic equivalency evaluation
- Alternative assessment
- Classroom walkthrough
- Competency evaluation
- Criterion-referenced test
- Design Focused Evaluation
- Evaluation methods and techniques
- Grading
- Knowledge survey
- Norm-referenced test
- Performance evaluation
- Program evaluation
- Standardized testing
- Standardized testing and public policy
- Teacher quality assessment
- Washington County Closed-Circuit Educational Television Project

== Notes ==
1. Joint Committee on Standards for Educational Evaluation. (1988). The Personnel Evaluation Standards: How to Assess Systems for Evaluating Educators. Newbury Park, CA: Sage Publications.
2. Joint Committee on Standards for Educational Evaluation. (1994). The Program Evaluation Standards, 2nd Edition. Newbury Park, CA: Sage Publications.
3. Committee on Standards for Educational Evaluation. (2003). The Student Evaluation Standards: How to Improve Evaluations of Students. Newbury Park, CA: Corwin Press.
