= David Hestenes =

American physicist and science educator

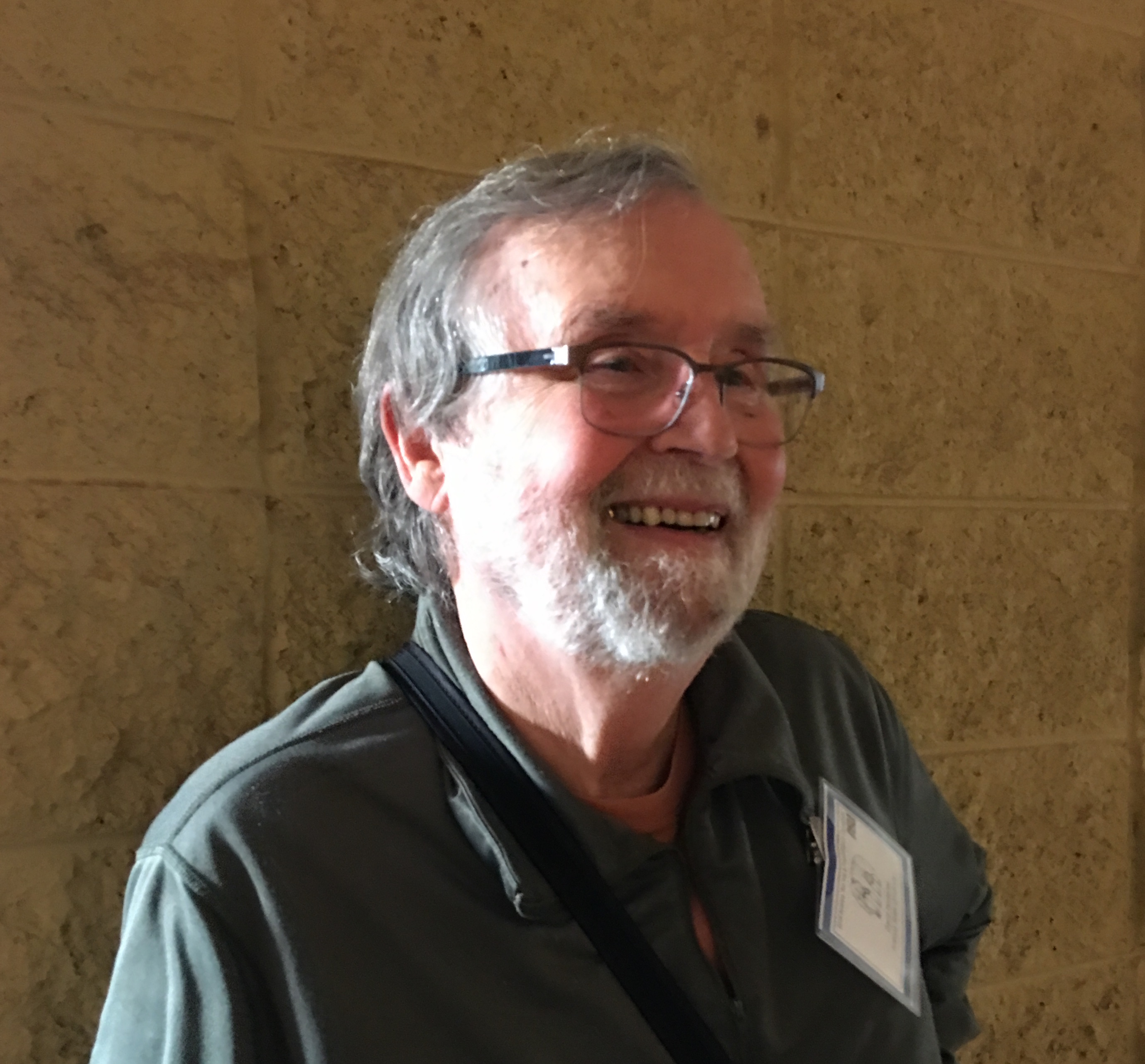
- Hestenes at ASU SciAPP conference, March 2019
- Born: David Orlin Hestenes; May 21, 1933 (age 93); Chicago, Illinois, U.S.
- Education: UCLA; Pacific Lutheran University
- Known for: Geometric algebra
- Father: Magnus Hestenes
- Awards: Oersted Medal (2002)
- Scientific career
- Fields: Physics
- Workplaces: Arizona State University

David Orlin Hestenes (born May 21, 1933) is an American theoretical physicist and science educator. He is best known as chief architect of geometric algebra as a unified language for mathematics and physics, and as founder of Modelling Instruction, a research-based program to reform K–12 Science, Technology, Engineering, and Mathematics (STEM) education.

For more than 30 years, he was employed in the Department of Physics and Astronomy of Arizona State University (ASU), where he retired with the rank of research professor and is now emeritus.

== Life and career ==
=== Education and doctorate degree ===
David Orlin Hestenes (eldest son of mathematician Magnus Hestenes) was born 1933 in Chicago, Illinois. Beginning college as a pre-medical major at UCLA from 1950 to 1952, he graduated from Pacific Lutheran University in 1954 with degrees in philosophy and speech. After serving in the U.S. Army from 1954 to 1956, he entered UCLA as an unclassified graduate student, completed a physics M.A. in 1958 and won a University Fellowship. His mentor at UCLA was the physicist Robert Finkelstein, who was working on unified field theories at that time. A serendipitous encounter with lecture notes by mathematician Marcel Riesz inspired Hestenes to study a geometric interpretation of Dirac matrices. He obtained his Ph.D. from UCLA with a thesis entitled Geometric Calculus and Elementary Particles. Shortly thereafter he recognized that the Dirac algebras and Pauli matrices could be unified in matrix-free form by a device later called a spacetime split. Then he revised his thesis and published it in 1966 as a book, Space–Time Algebra, now referred to as spacetime algebra (STA). This was the first major step in developing a unified, coordinate-free geometric algebra and calculus for all of physics.

=== Postdoctorate research and career ===
From 1964 to 1966, Hestenes was an NSF Postdoctoral Fellow at Princeton with John Archibald Wheeler. In 1966 he joined the physics department at Arizona State University, rising to full professor in 1976 and retiring in 2000 to Emeritus Professor of Physics.

In 1980 and 1981 as a NASA Faculty Fellow and in 1983 as a NASA Consultant he worked at Jet Propulsion Laboratory on orbital mechanics and attitude control, where he applied geometric algebra in development of new mathematical techniques published in a textbook/monograph New Foundations for Classical Mechanics.

In 1983 he joined with entrepreneur Robert Hecht-Nielsen and psychologist Peter Richard Killeen in conducting the first ever conference devoted exclusively to neural network modeling of the brain. In 1987, he became the first visiting scholar in the Department of Cognitive and Neural Systems (Boston University) and worked on neuroscience research for a period.

Hestenes has been a principal investigator for NSF grants seeking to teach physics through modeling and to measure student understanding of physics models at both the high school and university levels.

In the 2020s, Hestenes backed an anti-gravity propulsion company formed by Joe Firmage, an investor and former founder of USWeb.

== Work ==
Hestenes has worked in mathematical and theoretical physics, geometric algebra, neural networks, and cognitive research in science education. He is the prime mover behind the contemporary resurgence of interest in geometric algebras and in other offshoots of Clifford algebras as ways of formalizing theoretical physics.

=== Geometric algebra and calculus ===
Spacetime algebra provided the starting point for two main lines of research: on its implications for quantum mechanics specifically and for mathematical physics generally.

The first line began with the fact that reformulation of the Dirac equation in terms of spacetime algebra reveals hidden geometric structure. Among other things, it reveals that the complex factor $i \hbar$ in the equation is a geometric quantity (a bivector) identified with electron spin, where $i$ specifies the spin direction and $\hbar /2$ is the spin magnitude. The implications of this insight have been studied in a long series of papers with the most significant conclusion linking it to Schrödinger's zitterbewegung and proposing a zitterbewegung interpretation of quantum mechanics. Research in this direction is still active.

The second line of research was dedicated to extending geometric algebra to a self-contained geometric calculus for use in theoretical physics. Its culmination is the book Clifford Algebra to Geometric Calculus which follows an approach to differential geometry that uses the shape tensor (second fundamental form). Innovations in the book include the concepts of vector manifold, differential outermorphism, vector derivative that enables coordinate-free calculus on manifolds, and an extension of the Cauchy integral theorem to higher dimensions.

Hestenes emphasizes the important role of the mathematician Hermann Grassmann for the development of geometric algebra, with William Kingdon Clifford building on Grassmann's work. Hestenes is adamant about calling this mathematical approach “geometric algebra” and its extension “geometric calculus,” rather than referring to it as “Clifford algebra”. He emphasizes the universality of this approach, the foundations of which were laid by both Grassmann and Clifford. He points out that contributions were made by many individuals, and Clifford himself used the term “geometric algebra” which reflects the fact that this approach can be understood as a mathematical formulation of geometry, whereas, so Hestenes asserts, the term “Clifford algebra” is often regarded as simply “just one more algebra among many other algebras”, which withdraws attention from its role as a unified language for mathematics and physics.

Hestenes' work has been applied to Lagrangian field theory, formulation of a gauge theory of gravity alternative to general relativity by Lasenby, Doran and Gull, which they call gauge theory gravity (GTG), and it has been applied to spin representations of Lie groups. Most recently, it led Hestenes to formulate conformal geometric algebra, a new approach to computational geometry. This has found a rapidly increasing number of applications in engineering and computer science.

He has contributed to the main conferences in this field, the International Conference on Clifford Algebras (ICCA) and the Applications of Geometric Algebra in Computer Science and Engineering (AGACSE) series.

=== Modeling theory and instruction ===
Since 1980, Hestenes has been developing a Modeling Theory of science and cognition, especially to guide the design of science instruction. The theory distinguishes sharply between conceptual models that constitute the content core of science and the mental models that are essential to understand them. Modeling Instruction is designed to engage students in all aspects of modeling, broadly conceived as constructing, testing, analyzing and applying scientific models. To assess the effectiveness of Modeling Instruction, Hestenes and his students developed the Force Concept Inventory, a concept inventory tool for evaluating student understanding of introductory physics.

After a decade of education research to develop and validate the approach, Hestenes was awarded grants from the National Science Foundation for another decade to spread the Modeling Instruction Program nationwide. As of 2011, more than 4000 teachers had participated in summer workshops on modeling, including nearly 10% of the United States' high school physics teachers. It is estimated that Modeling teachers reach more than 100,000 students each year.

One outcome of the program is that the teachers created their own non-profit organization, the American Modeling Teachers Association (AMTA), to continue and expand the mission after government funding terminated. The AMTA has expanded to a nationwide community of teachers dedicated to addressing the nation's Science, Technology, Engineering, and Mathematics (STEM) education crisis. Another outcome of the Modeling Program was creation of a graduate program at Arizona State University for sustained professional development of STEM teachers. This provides a validated model for similar programs at universities across the country.

== Awards and fellowships ==
- 2014 Excellence in Physics Education Award from the American Physical Society
- 2003 Award for excellence in educational research by the Council of Scientific Society Presidents
- 2002 Oersted Medal, awarded by the American Association of Physics Teachers for notable contributions to the teaching of physics
- Fellow of the American Physical Society
- Overseas Fellow of Churchill College, Cambridge
- Foundations of Physics Honoree (Sept.–Nov. issues, 1993)
- Fulbright Research Scholar (England) 1987–1988
- NASA Faculty Fellow (Jet Propulsion Laboratory) 1980, 1981
- NSF Postdoctoral Fellow (Princeton) 1964–1966
- University Fellow (UCLA) 1958–1959

== Publications ==
Books

- D. Hestenes: Space-Time Algebra, 2nd ed., Birkhäuser, 2015, ISBN 978-3319184128
- D. Hestenes: New Foundations for Classical Mechanics, Fundamental Theories of Physics, 2nd ed., Springer Verlag, 1999, ISBN 978-0792355144
- D. Hestenes, A. Weingartshofer (eds.): The Electron: New Theory and Experiment, Fundamental Theories of Physics, Springer, 1991, ISBN 978-0792313564
- D. Hestenes, Garret Sobczyk: Clifford Algebra to Geometric Calculus: A Unified Language for Mathematics and Physics, Fundamental Theories of Physics, Springer, 1987, ISBN 978-9027725615
