= Edwards Personal Preference Schedule =

Non-projective personality inventory

Developed by psychologist and University of Washington professor Allen L. Edwards, the Edwards Personal Preference Schedule (EPPS) is a forced choice, objective, non-projective personality inventory. The target audience in between the ages of 16-85 and takes about 45 minutes to complete. Edwards derived the test content from the human needs system theory proposed by Henry Alexander Murray, which measures the rating of individuals in fifteen normal needs or motives. The EPPS was designed to illustrate relative importance to the individual of several significant needs and motives. It is useful in counseling situations when responses are reviewed with the examinee.

== Murray's Theory of Psychogenic Needs ==
Murray's system of human needs has influenced the making of personality tests for years. By incorporating his theory into personality testing, one can determine how one may act in a specific situation, as an employee, student, parent. The list goes on and on. Following is an overview on Murray's theory.

American psychologist Henry Murray developed a theory of personality that was organized in terms of motives, presses, and needs. Murray described a need as a potentiality or readiness to respond in a certain way under certain given circumstances.

Theories of personality based upon needs and motives suggest that our personalities are a reflection of behaviors controlled by needs. While some needs are temporary and changing, other needs are more deeply seated in our nature. According to Murray, these psychogenic needs function mostly on the unconscious level, but play a major role in our personality.

The Personality Research Form and the Jackson Personality Inventory are also structured personality tests based on Murray's theory of needs but were constructed slightly differently than the EPPS in hopes of increasing validity.

== Test Format ==
=== The 15 personality variable scales ===
On the EPPS there are nine statements used for each scale. Social Desirability ratings have been done for each item, and the pairing of items attempts to match items of approximately equal social desirability. Fifteen pairs of items are repeated twice for the consistency scale.

1. Achievement: A need to accomplish tasks well
2. Deference: A need to conform to customs and defer to others
3. Order: A need to plan well and be organized
4. Exhibition: A need to be the center of attention in a group
5. Autonomy: A need to be free of responsibilities and obligations
6. Affiliation: A need to form strong friendships and attachments
7. Intraception: A need to analyze behaviors and feelings of others
8. Succorance: A need to receive support and attention from others
9. Dominance: A need to be a leader and influence others
10. Degradation: A need to accept blame for problems and confess errors to others
11. Nurturance: A need to be of assistance to others
12. Change: A need to seek new experiences and avoid routine
13. Endurance: A need to follow through on tasks and complete assignments
14. Heterosexuality: A need to be associated with and attractive to members of the opposite sex
15. Aggression: A need to express one's opinion and be critical of others

(Edwards, 1959/1985)

=== Test Consistency ===
The inventory consists of 225 pairs of statements in which items from each of the 15 scales are paired with items from the other 14 plus the other fifteen pairs of items for the optional consistency check. This leaves the total number of items (14x15) at 210. Edwards has used the last 15 items to offer the candidate the same item twice, using the results to calculate a consistency score. The result will be considered valid if the consistency checks for more than 9 out of 15 paired items. Within each pair, the subjects choose one statement as more characteristic of themselves, reducing the social desirability factor of the test. Due to the forced choice, the EPPS is an ipsative test, the statements are made in relation to the strength of an individual's other needs. Hence, like personality, it is not absolute. Results of the test are reliable, although there are doubts about the consistency scale.

== Validity ==
The manual reports studies comparing the EPPS with the Guilford Martin Personality Inventory and the Taylor Manifest Anxiety Scale. Other researchers have correlated the California Psychological Inventory, the Adjective Check List, the Thematic Apperception Test, the Strong Vocational Interest Blank, and the MMPI with the EPPS. In these studies there are often statistically significant correlations among the scales of these tests and the EPPS, but the relationships are usually low-to-moderate and sometimes are difficult for the researcher to explain. Since the MMPI is still actively used today on a worldwide basis as a major brand test this comparison might be the most interesting to study.

== Suggested Uses ==
The EPPS has been designed primarily for personal counselling, but has found its way into recruitment as well. The EPPS is very suitable for these purposes.

== Reliability ==
The inter-correlations of the variables measured by EPPS are quite low. It indicates that the variables being measured are relatively independent and the schedule is quite reliable.

== Copyrights ==
The EPPS has been published for a long period of time through The Psychological Corporation, now known as Harcourt Assessment. In 2002 the worldwide publishing rights have been returned by Harcourt to the Allen L. Edwards Living Trust. Internationally there is a translation in Dutch, which has been published in the Netherlands legally until 2002 (by Harcourt Test Publishers). There is also a translation into Japanese, published in 1970 by Nihon Bunka Kagakusha, Tokyo. The EPPS is translated into Spanish in 2014 in Mexico.

Currently copyrights are held by The Allen L Edwards Living Trust worldwide. The EPPS is published by Test Dimensions Publishers in English, Dutch and Spanish.

== See also ==
- Personality and Preference Inventory
