= Personality test =

Method of assessing human personality constructs

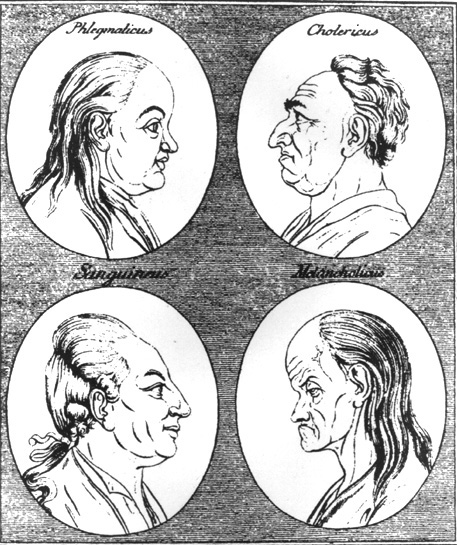
- The four temperaments as illustrated by Johann Kaspar Lavater
- MeSH: D010556

A personality test is a method of assessing human personality constructs. Most personality assessment instruments (despite being loosely referred to as "personality tests") are in fact introspective (i.e., subjective) self-report questionnaire (Q-data, in terms of LOTS data) measures or reports from life records (L-data) such as rating scales. Attempts to construct actual performance tests of personality have been very limited even though Raymond Cattell with his colleague Frank Warburton compiled a list of over 2000 separate objective tests that could be used in constructing objective personality tests. One exception, however, was the Objective-Analytic Test Battery, a performance test designed to quantitatively measure 10 factor-analytically discerned personality trait dimensions. A major problem with both L-data and Q-data methods is that because of item transparency, rating scales, and self-report questionnaires are highly susceptible to motivational and response distortion ranging from lack of adequate self-insight (or biased perceptions of others) to downright dissimulation (faking good/faking bad) depending on the reason/motivation for the assessment being undertaken.

The first personality assessment measures were developed in the 1920s and were intended to ease the process of personnel selection, particularly in the armed forces. Since these early efforts, a wide variety of personality scales and questionnaires have been developed, including the Minnesota Multiphasic Personality Inventory (MMPI), the Sixteen Personality Factor Questionnaire (16PF), the Comrey Personality Scales (CPS), among many others. Although popular especially among personnel consultants, the Myers–Briggs Type Indicator (MBTI) has numerous psychometric deficiencies. More recently, a number of instruments based on the Five Factor Model of personality have been constructed such as the Revised NEO Personality Inventory. However, the Big Five and related Five Factor Model have been challenged for accounting for less than two-thirds of the known trait variance in the normal personality sphere alone.

Estimates of how much the personality assessment industry in the US is worth range anywhere from $2 and $4 billion a year (as of 2013). Personality assessment is used in wide a range of contexts, including individual and relationship counseling, clinical psychology, forensic psychology, school psychology, career counseling, employment testing, occupational health and safety and customer relationship management.

== History ==
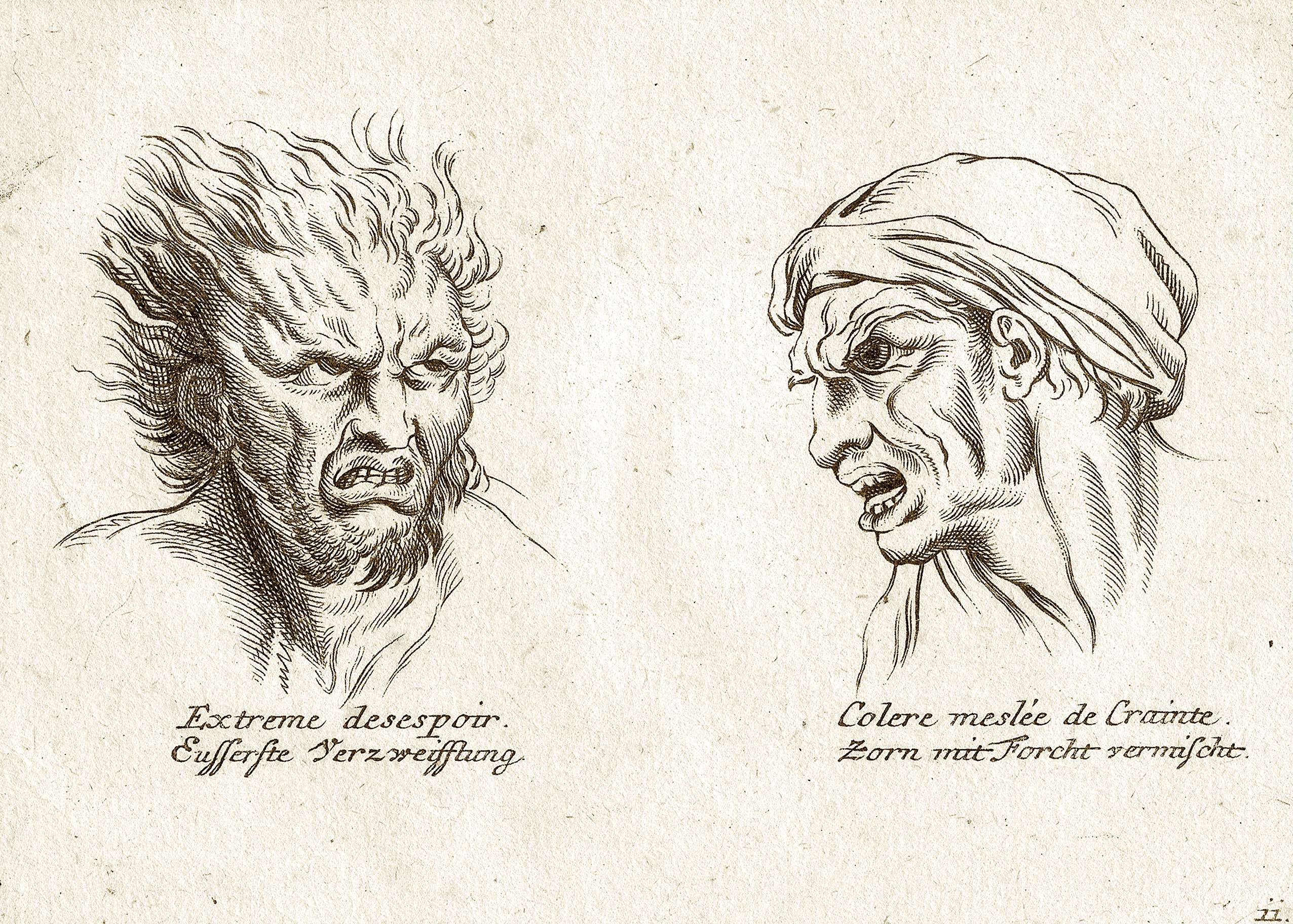
Illustration in a 19th-century book depicting physiognomy

The origins of personality assessment date back to the 18th and 19th centuries, when personality was assessed through phrenology, the measurement of bumps on the human skull, and physiognomy, which assessed personality based on a person's outer appearances. Sir Francis Galton took another approach to assessing personality late in the 19th century. Based on the lexical hypothesis, Galton estimated the number of adjectives that described personality in the English dictionary. Galton's list was eventually refined by Louis Leon Thurstone to 60 words that were commonly used for describing personality at the time. Through factor analyzing responses from 1300 participants, Thurstone was able to reduce this severely restricted pool of 60 adjectives into seven common factors. This procedure of factor analyzing common adjectives was later utilized by Raymond Cattell (7th most highly cited psychologist of the 20th Century—based on the peer-reviewed journal literature), who subsequently utilized a data set of over 4000 affect terms from the English dictionary that eventually resulted in construction of the Sixteen Personality Factor Questionnaire (16PF) which also measured up to eight second-stratum personality factors. Of the many introspective (i.e., subjective) self-report instruments constructed to measure the putative Big Five personality dimensions, perhaps the most popular has been the Revised NEO Personality Inventory (NEO-PI-R) However, the psychometric properties of the NEO-PI-R (including its factor analytic/construct validity) has been severely criticized.

Another early personality instrument was the Woodworth Personal Data Sheet, a self-report inventory developed for World War I and used for the psychiatric screening of new draftees.

== Overview ==
There are many different types of personality assessment measures. The self-report inventory involves administration of many items requiring respondents to introspectively assess their own personality characteristics. This is highly subjective, and because of item transparency, such Q-data measures are highly susceptible to motivational and response distortion. Respondents are required to indicate their level of agreement with each item using a Likert scale or, more accurately, a Likert-type scale. An item on a personality questionnaire, for example, might ask respondents to rate the degree to which they agree with the statement "I talk to a lot of different people at parties" on a scale from 1 ("strongly disagree") to 5 ("strongly agree").

Historically, the most widely used multidimensional personality instrument is the Minnesota Multiphasic Personality Inventory (MMPI), a psychopathology instrument originally designed to assess archaic psychiatric nosology.

In addition to subjective/introspective self-report inventories, there are several other methods for assessing human personality, including observational measures, ratings of others, projective tests (e.g., the TAT and Ink Blots), and actual objective performance tests (T-data).

== Topics ==
=== Norms ===
The meaning of personality test scores are difficult to interpret in a direct sense. For this reason substantial effort is made by producers of personality tests to produce norms to provide a comparative basis for interpreting a respondent's test scores. Common formats for these norms include percentile ranks, z scores, sten scores, and other forms of standardized scores.

=== Test development ===
A substantial amount of research and thinking has gone into the topic of personality test development. Development of personality tests tends to be an iterative process whereby a test is progressively refined. Test development can proceed on theoretical or statistical grounds. There are three commonly used general strategies: Inductive, Deductive, and Empirical. Scales created today will often incorporate elements of all three methods.

Deductive assessment construction begins by selecting a domain or construct to measure. The construct is thoroughly defined by experts and items are created which fully represent all the attributes of the construct definition. Test items are then selected or eliminated based upon which will result in the strongest internal validity for the scale. Measures created through deductive methodology are equally valid and take significantly less time to construct compared to inductive and empirical measures. The clearly defined and face valid questions that result from this process make them easy for the person taking the assessment to understand. Although subtle items can be created through the deductive process, these measure often are not as capable of detecting lying as other methods of personality assessment construction.

Inductive assessment construction begins with the creation of a multitude of diverse items. The items created for an inductive measure to not intended to represent any theory or construct in particular. Once the items have been created they are administered to a large group of participants. This allows researchers to analyze natural relationships among the questions and label components of the scale based upon how the questions group together. Several statistical techniques can be used to determine the constructs assessed by the measure. Exploratory Factor Analysis and Confirmatory Factor Analysis are two of the most common data reduction techniques that allow researchers to create scales from responses on the initial items.

The Five Factor Model of personality was developed using this method. Advanced statistical methods include the opportunity to discover previously unidentified or unexpected relationships between items or constructs. It also may allow for the development of subtle items that prevent test takers from knowing what is being measured and may represent the actual structure of a construct better than a pre-developed theory. Criticisms include a vulnerability to finding item relationships that do not apply to a broader population, difficulty identifying what may be measured in each component because of confusing item relationships, or constructs that were not fully addressed by the originally created questions.

Empirically derived personality assessments require statistical techniques. One of the central goals of empirical personality assessment is to create a test that validly discriminates between two distinct dimensions of personality. Empirical tests can take a great deal of time to construct. In order to ensure that the test is measuring what it is purported to measure, psychologists first collect data through self- or observer reports, ideally from a large number of participants.

=== Self- vs. observer-reports ===
A personality test can be administered directly to the person being evaluated or to an observer. In a self-report, the individual responds to personality items as they pertain to the person himself/herself. Self-reports are commonly used. In an observer-report, a person responds to the personality items as those items pertain to someone else. To produce the most accurate results, the observer needs to know the individual being evaluated. Combining the scores of a self-report and an observer report can reduce error, providing a more accurate depiction of the person being evaluated. Self- and observer-reports tend to yield similar results, supporting their validity.

=== Direct observation reports ===
Direct observation involves a second party directly observing and evaluating someone else. The second party observes how the target of the observation behaves in certain situations (e.g., how a child behaves in a schoolyard during recess). The observations can take place in a natural (e.g., a schoolyard) or artificial setting (social psychology laboratory). Direct observation can help identify job applicants (e.g., work samples) who are likely to be successful or maternal attachment in young children (e.g., Mary Ainsworth's strange situation). The object of the method is to directly observe genuine behaviors in the target. A limitation of direct observation is that the target persons may change their behavior because they know that they are being observed. A second limitation is that some behavioral traits are more difficult to observe (e.g., sincerity) than others (e.g., sociability). A third limitation is that direct observation is more expensive and time-consuming than a number of other methods (e.g., self-report).

=== Personality tests in the workplace ===
Though personality tests date back to the early 20th century, it was not until 1988 when it became illegal in the United States for employers to use polygraphs that they began to more broadly utilize personality tests. The idea behind these personality tests is that employers can reduce their turnover rates and prevent economic losses in the form of people prone to thievery, drug abuse, emotional disorders or violence in the workplace. There is a chance that an applicant may fake responses to personality test items in order to make the applicant appear more attractive to the employing organization than the individual actually is.

Personality tests are often part of management consulting services, as having a certification to conduct a particular test is a way for a consultant to offer an additional service and demonstrate their qualifications. The tests are used in narrowing down potential job applicants, as well as which employees are more suitable for promotion. The United States federal government is a notable customer of personality test services outside the private sector with approximately 200 federal agencies, including the military, using personality assessment services.

Despite evidence showing personality tests as one of the least reliable metrics in assessing job applicants, they remain popular as a way to screen candidates.

=== Test evaluation ===
There are several criteria for evaluating a personality test. For a test to be successful, users need to be sure that (a) test results are replicable and (b) the test measures what its creators purport it to measure. Fundamentally, a personality test is expected to demonstrate reliability and validity. Reliability refers to the extent to which test scores, if a test were administered to a sample twice within a short period of time, would be similar in both administrations. Test validity refers to evidence that a test measures the construct (e.g., neuroticism) that it is supposed to measure.

=== Analysis ===
A respondent's response is used to compute the analysis. Analysis of data is a long process. Two major theories are used here: classical test theory (CTT), used for the observed score; and item response theory (IRT), "a family of models for persons' responses to items". The two theories focus upon different 'levels' of responses and researchers are implored to use both in order to fully appreciate their results.

=== Non-response ===
Firstly, item non-response needs to be addressed. Non-response can either be unit, where a person gave no response for any of the n items, or item, i.e., individual question. Unit non-response is generally dealt with exclusion. Item non-response should be handled by imputation – the method used can vary between test and questionnaire items.

=== Scoring ===
The conventional method of scoring items is to assign '0' for an incorrect answer and '1' for a correct answer. When tests have more response options (e.g. multiple choice items) '0' when incorrect, '1' for being partly correct and '2' for being correct. Personality tests can also be scored using a dimensional (normative) or a typological (ipsative) approach. Dimensional approaches such as the Big 5 describe personality as a set of continuous dimensions on which individuals differ. From the item scores, an 'observed' score is computed. This is generally found by summing the un-weighted item scores.

== Criticism and controversy ==
=== Personality versus social factors ===
In the 1960s and 1970s some psychologists dismissed the whole idea of personality, considering much behaviour to be context-specific. This idea was supported by the fact that personality often does not predict behaviour in specific contexts. However, more extensive research has shown that when behaviour is aggregated across contexts, that personality can be a mostly good predictor of behaviour. Almost all psychologists now acknowledge that both social and individual difference factors (i.e., personality) influence behaviour. The debate is currently more around the relative importance of each of these factors and how these factors interact.

=== Respondent faking ===
One problem with self-report measures of personality is that respondents are often able to distort their responses. Intentional faking is when responses are distorted in order to gain a benefit. There are two main types of faking: faking-good presenting a better self image and faking-bad presenting a worse self image.

Several meta-analyses show that people are able to substantially change their scores on personality tests when such tests are taken under high-stakes conditions, such as part of a job selection procedure.

Work in experimental settings has also shown that when student samples have been asked to deliberately fake on a personality test, they clearly demonstrated that they are capable of doing so. In 2007 over 5000 job applicants who completed the same personality test twice after a six-month gap, found that their results showed no significant differences, potentially indicating that people may not significantly distort their responses.

Several strategies have been adopted for reducing and detecting respondent faking. Researchers are looking at the timing of responses on electronically administered tests to assess faking. Brief simple syntax tends to show longer response times in faked responses than in comparison to truthful responses; longer, more complex, and negative phrasing does not show differences in timing. One strategy involves providing a warning on the test that methods exist for detecting faking and that detection will result in negative consequences for the respondent (e.g., not being considered for the job). Forced choice (ipsative testing) has three formats: PICK (selecting a best fitting statement), MOLE (selecting a most and least fitting statement), and RANK (a most to least alike ranking), the effectiveness of using forced choice to prevent faking is inconclusive.

More recently, Item Response Theory approaches have been adopted with some success in identifying item response profiles that flag fakers. While people can fake in practice they seldom do so to any significant level. To successfully fake means knowing what the ideal answer would be. Even with something as simple as assertiveness people who are unassertive and try to appear assertive often endorse the wrong items. This is because unassertive people confuse assertion with aggression, anger, oppositional behavior, etc.

=== Psychological research ===
Research on the importance of personality and intelligence in education shows evidence that when others provide the personality rating, rather than providing a self-rating, the outcome is nearly four times more accurate for predicting grades.

=== Additional applications ===
The MBTI questionnaire is a popular tool for people to use as part of self-examination or to find a shorthand to describe how they relate to others in society. It is well known from its widespread adoption in hiring practices, but popular among individuals for its focus exclusively on positive traits and "types" with memorable names. Some users of the questionnaire self-identify by their personality type on social media and dating profiles. Due to the publisher's strict copyright enforcement, many assessments come from free websites which provide modified tests based on the framework.

Unscientific personality type quizzes are also a common form of entertainment. In particular BuzzFeed became well known for publishing user-created quizzes, with personality-style tests often based on deciding which pop culture character or celebrity the user most resembles.

Personality test have also been used as a form of aptitude test in workplace or school environments. A test covering 15 personality types, including the "Big-5" personality traits, was used in a study to see if there is correlation between pilots' personality scores and success in the aviation field. The results showed correlation between high scores in conscientiousness and self-confidence but low levels of neuroticism had higher passing scores on aviation tests. However, personality tests are not a true science and cannot accurately predict the "ideal pilot."

Personality tests are also being adapted to be used on livestock. They are looking to see if the animals are bold, fearful or fearless, and how they interact with other livestock. These test are designed to predict a wide variety of things and how well they will do on the farm. For example, with chickens the test can predict whether they will vocalize their fear. These test can help farmers improve the well-being and productivity of their animals.

=== Dangers ===
There is an issue of privacy to be of concern forcing applicants to reveal private thoughts and feelings through his or her responses that seem to become a condition for employment. Another danger is the illegal discrimination of certain groups under the guise of a personality test.

In addition to the risks of personality test results being used outside of an appropriate context, they can give inaccurate results when conducted incorrectly. In particular, ipsative personality tests are often misused in recruitment and selection, where they are mistakenly treated as if they were normative measures.

== Effects of technological advancements on the field ==
New technological advancements are increasing the possible ways that data can be collected and analyzed, and broadening the types of data that can be used to reliably assess personality. Although qualitative assessments of job-applicants' social media have existed for nearly as long as social media itself, many scientific studies have successfully quantized patterns in social media usage into various metrics to assess personality quantitatively. Smart devices, such as smart phones and smart watches, are also now being used to collect data in new ways and in unprecedented quantities. Also, brain scan technology has dramatically improved, which is now being developed to analyze personalities of individuals extremely accurately.

Aside from the advancing data collection methods, data processing methods are also improving rapidly. Strides in big data and pattern recognition in enormous databases (data mining) have allowed for better data analysis than ever before. Also, this allows for the analysis of large amounts of data that was difficult or impossible to reliably interpret before (for example, from the internet). There are other areas of current work too, such as gamification of personality tests to make the tests more interesting and to lower effects of psychological phenomena that skews personality assessment data.

This data collection has also brought about machine created personality tests based on a person's digital footprint. So far, the test have proven to be fairly accurate, but this kind of tech is very new. This paper focuses specifically on how data mining plays a role in personality.

With new data collection methods comes new ethical concerns, such as over the analysis of one's public data to make assessments on their personality and when consent is needed.

== Examples of personality tests ==
- The first modern personality test was the Woodworth Personal Data Sheet, which was first used in 1919. It was designed to help the United States Army screen out recruits who might be susceptible to shell shock.
- The Rorschach inkblot test was introduced in 1921 as a way to determine personality by the interpretation of inkblots.
- The Thematic Apperception Test was commissioned by the Office of Strategic Services (O.S.S.) in the 1930s to identify personalities that might be susceptible to being turned by enemy intelligence.
- The Minnesota Multiphasic Personality Inventory was published in 1942 as a way to aid in assessing psychopathology in a clinical setting. It can also be used to assess the Personality Psychopathology Five (PSY-5), which are similar to the Five Factor Model (FFM; or Big Five personality traits). These five scales on the MMPI-2 include aggressiveness, psychoticism, disconstraint, negative emotionality/neuroticism, and introversion/low positive emotionality.
- Myers–Briggs Type Indicator (MBTI) is a questionnaire designed to measure psychological preferences in how people perceive the world and make decisions. This 16-type indicator test is based on Carl Jung's Psychological Types, developed during World War II by Isabel Myers and Katharine Briggs. The 16-type indicator includes a combination of Extroversion-Introversion, Sensing-Intuition, Thinking-Feeling and Judging-Perceiving. The MBTI utilizes two opposing behavioral divisions on four scales that yields a "personality type".
- OAD Survey is an adjective word list designated to measure seven work related personality traits and job behaviors: Assertiveness-Compliance, Extroversion-Introversion, Patience-Impatience, Detail-Broad, High Versatility-Low Versatility, Low Emotional IQ-High Emotional IQ, Low Creativity-High Creativity. It was first published in 1990 with periodic norm revisions to assure scale validity, reliability, and non-bias.
- Keirsey Temperament Sorter developed by David Keirsey is influenced by Isabel Myers sixteen types and Ernst Kretschmer's four types.
- The True Colors Test developed by Don Lowry in 1978 is based on the work of David Keirsey in his book, Please Understand Me, as well as the Myers-Briggs Type Indicator and provides a model for understanding personality types using the colors blue, gold, orange and green to represent four basic personality temperaments.
- The 16PF Questionnaire (16PF) was developed by Raymond Cattell and his colleagues in the 1940s and 1950s in a search to try to discover the basic traits of human personality using scientific methodology. The test was first published in 1949, and is now in its 5th edition, published in 1994. It is used in a wide variety of settings for individual and marital counseling, career counseling and employee development, in educational settings, and for basic research.
- The EQSQ Test developed by Simon Baron-Cohen, Sally Wheelwright centers on the empathizing-systemizing theory of the male versus the female brain types.
- The Personality and Preference Inventory (PAPI), originally designed by Dr Max Kostick, Professor of Industrial Psychology at Boston State College, in Massachusetts, USA, in the early 1960s evaluates the behaviour and preferred work styles of individuals.
- The Strength Deployment Inventory, developed by Elias Porter in 1971 and is based on his theory of Relationship Awareness. Porter was the first known psychometrician to use colors (Red, Green and Blue) as shortcuts to communicate the results of a personality test.
- The Newcastle Personality Assessor (NPA), created by Daniel Nettle, is a short questionnaire designed to quantify personality on five dimensions: Extraversion, Neuroticism, Conscientious, Agreeableness, and Openness.
- The DISC assessment is based on the research of William Moulton Marston and later work by John Grier, and identifies four personality types: Dominance; Influence; Steadiness and Conscientiousness. It is used widely in Fortune 500 companies, for-profit and non-profit organizations.
- The Winslow Personality Profile measures 24 traits on a decile scale. It has been used in the National Football League, the National Basketball Association, the National Hockey League and every draft choice for Major League Baseball for the last 30 years and can be taken online for personal development.
- Other personality tests include Forté Profile, Millon Clinical Multiaxial Inventory, Eysenck Personality Questionnaire, Swedish Universities Scales of Personality, Edwin E. Wagner's The Hand Test, and Enneagram of Personality.
- The HEXACO Personality Inventory – Revised (HEXACO PI-R) is based on the HEXACO model of personality structure, which consists of six domains, the five domains of the Big Five model, as well as the domain of Honesty-Humility.
- The Personality Inventory for DSM-5 (PID-5) was developed in September 2012 by the DSM-5 Personality and Personality Disorders Workgroup with regard to a personality trait model proposed for DSM-5, namely the Alternative DSM-5 model for personality disorders. The PID-5 includes 25 maladaptive personality traits as determined by Krueger, Derringer, Markon, Watson, and Skodol.
- The Process Communication Model (PCM), developed by Taibi Kahler with NASA funding, was used to assist with shuttle astronaut selection. Now it is a non-clinical personality assessment, communication and management methodology that is now applied to corporate management, interpersonal communications, education, and real-time analysis of call centre interactions among other uses.
- The Birkman Method (TBM) was developed by Roger W. Birkman in the late 1940s. The instrument consists of ten scales describing "occupational preferences" (Interests), 11 scales describing "effective behaviors" (Usual behavior) and 11 scales describing interpersonal and environmental expectations (Needs). A corresponding set of 11 scale values was derived to describe "less than effective behaviors" (Stress behavior). TBM was created empirically. The psychological model is most closely associated with the work of Kurt Lewin. Occupational profiling consists of 22 job families with over 200 associated job titles connected to O*Net.
- The International Personality Item Pool (IPIP) is a public domain set of more than 2000 personality items which can be used to measure many personality variables, including the Five Factor Model.
- The Guilford-Zimmerman Temperament Survey examined 10 factors that represented normal personality, and was used in both longitudinal studies and to examine the personality profiles of Italian pilots.
- The Short Dark Triad (SD-3) examines three socially unacceptable traits: narcissism, Machiavellianism, and psychopathy.
- The Dark Triad Dirty Dozen (DTDD) is a 12-item version of a dark triad test.

=== Personality tests of the five factor model ===
Different types of the Big Five personality traits:

- The Revised NEO Personality Inventory (NEO PI-R) is one of the most significant measures of the Five Factor Model (FFM). The measure was created by Costa and McCrae and contains 240 items in the forms of sentences. Costa and McCrae had divided each of the five domains into six facets each, 30 facets total, and changed the way the FFM is measured.
- The Five-Factor Model Rating Form (FFMRF) was developed by Lynam and Widiger in 2001 as a shorter alternative to the NEO PI-R. The form consists of 30 facets, 6 facets for each of the Big Five factors.
- The Ten-Item Personality Inventory (TIPI) and the Five Item Personality Inventory (FIPI) are very abbreviated rating forms of the Big Five personality traits.
- The Five Factor Personality Inventory – Children (FFPI-C) was developed to measure personality traits in children based upon the Five Factor Model (FFM).
- The Big Five Inventory (BFI), developed by John, Donahue, and Kentle, is a 44-item self-report questionnaire consisting of adjectives that assess the domains of the Five Factor Model (FFM). The 10-Item Big Five Inventory is a simplified version of the well-established BFI. It is developed to provide a personality inventory under time constraints. The BFI-10 assesses the five dimensions of BFI using only two items each to cut down on length of BFI.
- The Semi-structured Interview for the Assessment of the Five-Factor Model (SIFFM) is the only semi-structured interview intended to measure a personality model or personality disorder. The interview assesses the five domains and 30 facets as presented by the NEO PI-R, and it additional assesses both normal and abnormal extremities of each facet.
- The Big Five Aspects Scale (BFAS) assesses the five domains and 10 sub-domains that cover nearly all of the personality differences found between individuals (per factor analysis) as presented in this paper by DeYoung & Peterson.

== See also ==
- Clinical psychology
- Employment testing
- Forer effect
- Industrial and organizational psychology
- Learning styles
- List of personality tests
- Objective test
- Personality psychology
- Projective test
- Psychological testing
- Sexological testing
