= Comrey Personality Scales =

Personality test

The Comrey Personality Scales (also known as Comrey Personality Test or CPT) is a personality test developed by Andrew L. Comrey in 1970. The CPT measures eight main scales and two validity scales. The test is currently distributed by Educational and Industrial Testing Service. The test consists of 180 items rated on a seven-point scale.

== History and development ==
Comrey started developing the CPT since 1961 and intended the test to improve upon prior personality tests, which he viewed as possibly creating spurious relationships between the test items and the resulting personality dimensions. In order to do this, Comrey used a technique called factored homogenous item dimension (FHID) to increase the validity of the personality dimensions that are generated during factor analysis. His first attempt was to use the technique to generate personality dimensions from the taxonomies of Hans Eysenck, Raymond B. Cattell, J. P. Guilford, as well as the Minnesota Multiphasic Personality Inventory, which eventually yielded the first six personality dimensions of CPT.

Several dimensions were added to the CPT when the concurrent validity of the CPT was tested with the Guilford-Zimmerman Temperament Survey (GZTS). The Socialization personality dimension was added to the COT when the tests showed items that measured the existence of this dimension, even though neither test distinguished the dimension separately. The GZTS also measured three personality dimensions that did not exist in the CPT, which were General Activity, Masculinity, and Thoughtfulness. The first two dimensions were eventually incorporated in the final version of the CPT under the Activity VS. Lack of energy scale (A) and the Masculinity vs. Femininity scale (M).

Additional validity testing with Cattell's 16PF and the Eysenck Personality Questionnaire also created changes to the scale. The Shyness dimension was separated into two distinct scales, and the dimension was later reconceptualized as Extraversion-Introversion. Despite all the changes to the test, the CPT was finalized in 1970 with the publication of its manual.

== Scales ==
Throughout the development of the test, the CPT's eight personality dimensions were known under different names, but in its final version, they are known as the acronym TOCASEMP, and represented two extreme sides of a personality dimension. Each scale is represented by five factors, as detailed below.

CPT's Eight Personality Dimensions and Factors
Trust vs. Defensiveness (T)	Orderliness vs. Lack of Compulsion (O)	Social Conformity vs. Rebelliousness (C)	Activity vs. Lack of Energy (A)	Emotional Stability vs. Neuroticism (S)	Extraversion vs. Introversion (E)	Masculinity vs. Femininity (M)
Lack of cynicism	Neatness	Law enforcement	Exercise	Lack of inferiority feelings	Lack of reserve	No fear of bugs
Lack of defensiveness	Routine	Acceptance of social order	Energy	Lack of depression	Lack of seclusiveness	No crying
Belief in human worth	Order	Intolerance of noncomformity	Need to excel	Lack of agitation	No loss for words	No interest of love stories
Trust in human nature	Cautiousness	Respect of law	Liking for work	Lack of pessimism	Lack of shyness	Tolerance of blood
Lack of paranoia	Meticulousness	Need for approval	Stamina	Mood stability	No stage fright	Tolerance of vulgarity

== Test format ==
The CPT consists of 180 items measuring the TOCASEMP personality dimensions in eight scales measuring and two scales measuring response validity. These two scales are intended to check for possible confounding variable that would render the test result as invalid, including social desirability bias. Some of the items in CPT are reverse-coded. CPT uses two response scales to answer each items, each ranging from the value 1 to 7, which were defined differently.

== Psychometric properties ==
Since its initial inception, the CPT has proven to be a robust test, both in terms of validity and reliability. Besides its use of FHID to corroborate the CPT's internal validity, where it had yielded factor loadings from r = 0.30 to r = 0.84, Comrey also used several external validity procedures¸ including several concurrent validity testing with other personality indicators, such as the 16 PF. Although changes to the test occurred following the validation, factor analysis and correlation of the test items supported the existence and structure of the CPT's personality dimensions.

During the early stages of CPT's development, a construct validity testing on the test was also conducted on the biographical information provided by 209 university students in the United States. The findings in this study supported the existence of the eight personality dimensions of the CPT based on correlations with the research subject's data, such as marijuana consumption and high scorers in the C scale.

== Usage ==
The CPT is intended for use on the adult general population and has also been validated for usage in Italy, Brazil, South African (in Afrikaans language), and Russian populations.
