= Competency evaluation =

Competency evaluation may refer to:

- Competency evaluation (language), a means for teachers to determine the ability of their students in ways other than standardized testing
- Competency evaluation (law), an assessment of whether a defendant is of sound mind to stand trial
