= Walkthrough =

A walkthrough or walk-through may refer to one of the following topics:

- Factory tour
- Rehearsal
- Software walkthrough
- Strategy guide (video games)
- Video game walkthrough
- Tutoring
- Virtual tour
- Walk-through test, a component of a financial audit

== See also ==
- Classroom walkthrough
- Cognitive walkthrough
- List of gaming topics
