= Mary N. Meeker =

American educational psychologist and entrepreneur

Mary Nacol Meeker
- Born: 1921; Louisiana
- Died: 2003 (aged 81–82)
- Education: University of Texas; University of Southern California
- Occupations: educational psychologist and entrepreneur
- Spouse: Robert Meeker

Mary Nacol Meeker (1921–2003), was an American educational psychologist and entrepreneur. She is best known for her applying J. P. Guilford's Structure of Intellect theory of human intelligence to the field of education.

Meeker was born in Louisiana and grew up there and in Texas. She attended the University of Texas at Austin and graduated with a Bachelor of Science degree in psychology. Meeker subsequently moved to California and began graduate studies in educational psychology at the University of Southern California, where she studied with J. P. Guilford, whose work would be central to her career. Meeker earned a Master of Science, a Master of Education and, in 1971, a Ph.D. in Education from USC.

== SI and SOI ==
Meeker's doctoral dissertation focused on applying Guilford's Structure of Intellect theory ("SI") to creating assessments and curriculum materials for use in teaching children and adults. The premise of SI is that intelligence comprises many underlying mental abilities or factors, organized along three dimensions—Operations (e.g., comprehension), Content (e.g., semantic), and Products (e.g., relations). In this three-dimensional model, each intersection of the three dimensions represents as a unique intellectual ability, such as comprehension of semantic relations; that is, understanding analogies.

During Meeker's studies, she saw the potential of applying SI in the field of education, based on a twofold premise: 1) intelligence can be precisely measured using a test that identifies an individual's aptitude on the multiple intellectual abilities identified in the Structure of Intellect model; and 2) the individual's intellectual abilities can be remediated or improved using learning materials that target each particular ability. Meeker called her application of Guilford's theory "SOI."

=== SOI testing ===
SOI assessment materials, including the SOI Learning Abilities (or "SOI-LA") test instrument, measure intelligence corresponding to those intellectual abilities from Guilford's SI model that Meeker determined to be most closely correlated to educational and professional success. (She excluded other SI abilities from SOI due to their perceived difficulty of assessment or their lack of correlation to educational requirements.) After she normed and validated the SOI-LA instrument in the late 1970s and early 1980s, she began producing tests and corresponding remedial materials for school districts and private clinics. In many states, the SOI-LA is accepted for screening students for admission into gifted and special education school programs, and worldwide, SOI-LA is used in private clinics.

=== SOI training ===
SOI learning materials are useful in addressing learning disabilities in early childhood education. Basic school tasks such as reading or arithmetic are actually complex tasks that require application of multiple underlying abilities. Because children who fail at these classroom tasks often lack the underlying abilities to succeed at them, attempts to teach those children to perform such tasks are not successful. Some children who cannot read may lack the underlying intellectual ability to associate a word (i.e., a series of graphical figures) with its meaning (i.e., a semantic unit); and some children who cannot perform arithmetic may lack the underlying intellectual ability to associate a digit (a numeric unit) with its meaning (a symbolic unit). SOI training can remediate these underlying intellectual abilities to enable mastery of reading and arithmetic.

The SOI model is designed to address learning disabilities in stages. An SOI test assesses the individual's underlying intellectual abilities, including the constituent abilities enabling performance of the targeted task. Then, after the individual's SOI profile is compared against the intellectual abilities that enable the targeted task (such as reading or arithmetic), specific intellectual abilities are identified for remediation. Finally, SOI curriculum materials train the identified abilities so that, after the abilities are remediated, the individual may learn to perform the more complex task.

The SOI model can be useful in assessing learning styles, because the SOI-LA test includes separate measures of visual and auditory learning abilities. SOI has been related to the multiple intelligences theory promulgated by Howard Gardner.

== Later work ==
In 1975, Meeker and her husband, Robert Meeker, opened the SOI Institute, a business producing SOI tests and educational materials and conducting training for educators and related research. During the 1980s and 1990s, Meeker developed a wide reputation in the field of educational psychology, and continued to run the SOI Institute. During this time, Meeker was engaged as a consultant for the state departments of education in California, Idaho, Louisiana, Mississippi, Nevada, New Mexico, Ohio, Oklahoma, Oregon, South Carolina, Texas, Virginia, Washington and Wisconsin.

In the 1990s, Meeker worked extensively with Bridges Learning Systems, a commercial enterprise founded by former U.S. Senator William E. Brock to implement school programs based on Meeker's SOI work and on the Integrated Practice Protocol (IPP) she developed with her husband, Robert Meeker. IPP comprises SOI-related assessments and learning and teaching materials that incorporate intelligence assessment (such as with the SOI-LA test), vision assessment, and sensory integration assessment. For example, some children who cannot read may lack the underlying ability to visually distinguish one alphabetical character from another. This perceptual (visual) aspect of SOI illustrates the extensions of SOI application made in IPP by Meeker and Meeker.

In later life, Mary Meeker devoted herself semi-professionally to watercolor painting, winning a variety of local prizes. Her subjects of choice were florals and landscapes.

Mary Meeker died in 2003, survived by her husband, her three daughters, and two grandchildren. Her husband, Robert Meeker, continued her work via the operation of SOI Systems in Springfield, Oregon until 2021.

== Articles and books ==
- Meeker, M. N. (1969). The Structure of Intellect: Its Interpretation and Uses. Columbus, Ohio: Merrill.
- Meeker, M. N., Meeker R. J. & Roid. G. H. (1985). Structure of Intellect Learning Abilities Test (SOI-LA) Manual. Los Angeles, California: Western Psychological Services.
- Meeker, M. N., & Meeker, R. (1992). IPP (Integrated Practice Protocol: A treatment system for dysfunctional students). Vida, OR: SOI Systems.

=== Selected articles ===
- Meeker, M. N. (1965). A procedure for relating Sanford-Binet behavior samplings to Guilford's Structure of the Intellect. Journal of School Psychology III(3), pp. 26–36.
- Meeker, M. N. (1965). What about creativity for the preschool child? The Gifted Child Quarterly.
- Meeker, M. N. (1969). Understanding the evaluation of gifted: A new method. The Gifted Child Quarterly, Vol. XIII(4).
- Meeker, M. N. & Myers, C. E. (1971). Memory factors and school success of average and special groups of ninth-grade boys. Genetic Psychology Monographs, 83, 275-308.
- Meeker, M. N. (1972). Are you gifted at handling the gifted? Gifted Child Quarterly.
- Meeker, M. N. (1973). Individualized curriculum based on intelligence test patterns. In Coop & White (Eds.), Psychological Concepts in the Classroom. Harper & Row.
- Meeker, M. N. & Meeker, R. J. (1973). Strategies for assessing intellectual patterns in Black, Anglo, and Mexican-American boys — or any other children — and the implications for education. Journal of School Psychology 11 (4).
- Meeker, M. (1975). Planning curriculum using cognitive abilities from the Binet, WISC, and SOI-LA tests as the diagnostic basics. In M. Meeker (ed.), Collected Readings, Vol. I (pp. 2–3). El Segundo, CA: SOI Institute.
- Meeker, M. N. (1978). Measuring creativity from the child's point of view. Journal for Creative Behavior 12 (1), pp. 52–62.
- Meeker, M. N. (1979). The relevance of arithmetic testing to teaching arithmetic skills. The Gifted Child Quarterly XXII(2), pp. 297–303.
- Abroms, K. I. & Meeker, M. N.(1980). Learning disabilities: A diagnostic and educational challenge. Journal of Learning Disabilities 13 (9).
- Meeker, M. N. (1981). The SOI Institute based on Guilford's "Structure of the Intellect" model. Education 101(4), 302-309.
- Meeker, M. N. (1985). Brain Research: The Necessity for Separating Site, Actions, and Functions. Presented to the Neurobiology Conference of Extraordinary Giftedness, New York City. Also in Gifted Education International Vol. 5, No 3, pp. 148–154.
- Meeker, M. N. (1985). A curriculum for developing intelligence. Gifted Children Monthly.
- Meeker, M. N. & Meeker, R. J. (1986). The SOI system for gifted education. In J.S. Renzulli (Ed.), Systems and Models for Developing Programs for the Gifted and Talented.
- Meeker, M. N. (1987). A word to the coach. Gifted International, Vol 4. No. 2, pp. 78–88.
- Meeker, M. N. (1987). What happens when high school ends? Gifted Child Today, pp. 41–42.
- Meeker, M. N. (1989). Toys before and after Christmas. Gifted Child Today, Vol.12, No. 6, pp. 54–55.
- Meeker, M. N. (1990). On trying to be creative. Gifted Child Today, Vol.13, No. 6, pp. 2–5.
- Meeker, M. N. (1991). Structure of Intellect (SOI). In A.L. Costa (Ed.), Developing Minds Vol. 2, pp 3–8.
- Meeker, M. N. (1991). The gifted in search of a career. The Journal of the California Association for the Gifted.
- Meeker, M. N. (1991). How do arithmetic and math differ? Gifted Child Today, Vol. 14, No. 1, pp. 6–7.

== Honors and positions ==
- California Commission for Education, 1981
- California Committee for Assessing Disadvantaged, 1970
- American Advisory Council for Government Schools
- Secretary, National Association for Gifted Children
- Education Leader of the Year, Education, 1981
- Selected by U.S. Office of Education as one of five social scientists whose work held promise for education in the 21st century.
- Selected by the International Center for Studies in Creativity, Syracuse, New York, as one of the fifty most creative professional women in America, 2003
