= Karolinska Scales of Personality =

Personality test

Karolinska Scales of Personality is a personality test, superseded by the Swedish Universities Scales of Personality. It measures personalities with a 135-item questionnaire, answered on a four-point Likert scale and grouped into 15 scales:

1. Psychic anxiety
2. Somatic anxiety
3. Muscular tension
4. Psychasthenia
5. Inhibition of aggression
6. Detachment
7. Impulsiveness
8. Monotony avoidance (sensation seeking)
9. Socialization
10. Indirect aggression
11. Verbal aggression
12. Irritability
13. Suspicion
14. Guilt
15. Social desirability

A Spanish version also exists.

== See also ==
- NEO PI-R
- Temperament and Character Inventory
