= Psychasthenia =

- Specialty: Clinical psychology, psychiatry

Psychasthenia was a psychological disorder characterized by phobias, obsessions, compulsions, or excessive anxiety. The term is no longer in psychiatric diagnostic use (Note: It was removed from DSM in the IV edition and later from ICD in its 11th revision.), although it still forms one of the ten clinical subscales of the popular self-report personality inventories MMPI and MMPI-2. It is also one of the fifteen scales of the Karolinska Scales of Personality.

== MMPI ==
The MMPI subscale 7 describes psychasthenia as akin to obsessive-compulsive disorder, and as characterised by excessive doubts, compulsions, obsessions, and unreasonable fears. The psychasthenic has an inability to resist specific actions or thoughts, regardless of their maladaptive nature. In addition to obsessive-compulsive features, the scale taps abnormal fears, self-criticism, difficulties in concentration, and guilt feelings. The scale assesses long-term (trait) anxiety, although it is somewhat responsive to situational stress as well.

The psychasthenic has insufficient control over their conscious thinking and memory, sometimes wandering aimlessly and/or forgetting what they were doing. Thoughts can be scattered and take significant effort to organize, often resulting in sentences that do not come out as intended, therefore making little sense to others. The constant mental effort and characteristic insomnia induces fatigue, which worsens the condition. Symptoms can possibly be greatly reduced with concentration exercises and therapy, depending on whether the condition is psychological or biological.

== Earlier conceptions ==
The term "psychasthenia" was first primarily associated with French psychiatrist Pierre Janet, who divided the neuroses into the psychasthenias and the hysterias. (He discarded the then common term "neurasthenia" (weak nerves) since it implied a neurological theory where none existed.) Whereas the hysterias involved at their source a narrowing of the field of consciousness, the psychasthenias involved at root a disturbance in the fonction du reél ('function of reality'), a kind of weakness in the ability to attend to, adjust to, and synthesise one's changing experience (cf. executive functions in today's empiricist psychologies). Swiss psychiatrist Carl Jung later made Janet's hysteric and psychasthenic types the prototypes of his extroverted and introverted personalities.

The German-Swiss psychiatrist Karl Jaspers, following Janet, described psychasthenia as a variety of phenomena "held together by the theoretical concept of a 'diminution of psychic energy'." The psychasthenic person prefers to "withdraw from his fellows and not be exposed to situations in which his abnormally strong 'complexes' rob him of presence of mind, memory and poise." The psychasthenic lacks confidence, is prone to obsessional thoughts, unfounded fears, self-scrutiny and indecision. This state in turn promotes withdrawal from the world and daydreaming, yet this only makes things worse. "The psyche generally lacks an ability to integrate its life or to work through and manage its various experiences; it fails to build up its personality and make any steady development." Jaspers believed that some of Janet's more extreme cases of psychasthenia were cases of schizophrenia. Jaspers differentiates and contrasts psychasthenia with neurasthenia, defining the later in terms of "irritable weakness" and describing phenomena such as irritability, sensitivity, a painful sensibility, abnormal responsiveness to stimuli, bodily pains, strong experience of fatigue, etc.
