= LOTS (personality psychology) =

Classification method for personality psychology assessment data sources

LOTS is an acronym, suggested by Cattell in 1957 and later elaborated by Block, to provide a broad classification of data source for personality psychology assessment. Each data source has its advantage and disadvantage. Research on personality commonly employ different data source so as to represent better the pattern of one's distinctive features.

- L-data, refer to the life-outcome data, such as age, education, income, student grades at school, criminal and conviction record
- O-data, refer to observational data, such as observer rating from friends and family
- T-data, refer to standardised and objective test measurement, such as scored test, physiological response, reaction times (RT), implicit association test (IAT)
- S-data, refer to self-reports, such as questionnaires, personality test, structured interview
