= Robert E. Stake =

Robert E. Stake (born December 18, 1927) is an American professor. He is professor emeritus of education at the University of Illinois, Urbana-Champaign. Stake is a native of Adams, Nebraska. After earning a PhD in Psychometrics at Princeton University in 1958, he assumed the position of assistant professor of educational psychology at the University of Nebraska, which he held until moving to the University of Illinois in 1963. He became Associate Director of the Illinois State Testing Program. The testing program was absorbed by the Center for Instructional Research and Curriculum Evaluation (CIRCE) in 1969. There he served as Co-Director and subsequently in 1975 as Director of the CIRCE until his retirement in 1998. He has been a leader in development of program evaluation methods for decades. Among his many contributions are the 2010 book Qualitative Research: Studying How Things Work, and in 1995, The Art of Case Study Research. .

In the field of Educational assessment, Stake has stated that we need to gather different points of view in the process.

Stake was the recipient in 1988 of the Lazerfeld Award from the American Evaluation Association and an honorary doctorate from the University of Uppsala in 1994. He also received an honorary doctorate from the University of Valladolid in 2009. In 2007 Robert Stake received a Presidential Citation from the American Educational Research Association "for his significant contribution to qualitative methodology, to the theory and practice of evaluation".

Stake's writings and thinking in the field of program evaluation have influenced the work of numerous scholars in the field including that of Ernest R. House, his colleague at the University of Illinois at Urbana-Champaign from 1969 to 1985.

Robert Earl Stake is the father of four children.
