= Macabre constant =

Theory of bias in educational assessment

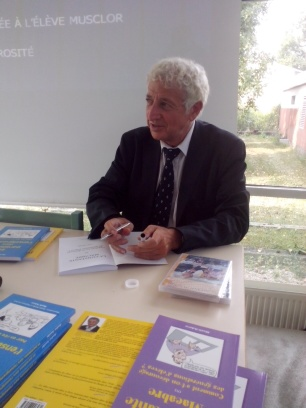
The author of the macabre constant

The macabre constant is a theorized bias in educational assessment that happens when a professor unconsciously splits students into three subjective categories—good, average and poor—regardless of their actual objective scholarly level. It was first proposed by the educational researcher André Antibi, appearing in his book "Constante macabre" published in 2003, and then in a subsequent book "Pour en finir avec la constante macabre" in 2007. Although the macabre constant is a socioeducational concept, interested in both describing the roots and the consequences, a similar concept of grades standardization was described as norm-referenced test or curved grading.

== Description ==
The macabre constant is a theoretical explanation of the supposedly prevalent fact (particularly in the French educational system) that there is a constant percentage of poor grades, of medium grades and of high grades in the educational system, no matter the actual academic level of the students and their proficiency at the knowledge and skills actually required. This concept does not apply only to elite courses (even if it is more prevalent in these courses), but also to general education and at all levels of education. This results in the socially relative selection of students, instead of an absolute, objective selection relative to the level of knowledge required. This phenomenon can form a large part of the cause of the distress and scholar disengagement for many students facing those issues, and thus it could be one of the main causes of educational failure.

Many parameters may contribute to the prevalence of this phenomenon, but the two main causes are:

- The tendency to sanction in the examination rather than emulating knowledge. This forces the reviewers to create tests based not on knowledge and skills, but on tricky questions, or even meta-knowledge (e.g., available in the book but not studied in the program or in the course with the professor).
- The credibility of the examination / teacher / institution vis-à-vis the society, leading to the establishment of a constant rate of failure.

Thus, the macabre constant would create an "artificial failure of students", which may potentially lead to a school disengagement of failing students by a mechanism similar to the learned helplessness.

== Studies ==
In 2006, Andre Antibi conducted a survey of 1900 teachers in France, which led to the result that "95% of the teachers recognized that the macabre constant existed, by which they account for the systematic attribution of bad marks."

In 2009, another survey of 3020 teachers led to the result that 99% of them recognizing the existence of the macabre constant.

In October 2011, a debate organized by SGEN-CFDT (syndicate for French national education and public research) gathered 150 teachers-researchers with André Antibi to discuss this phenomenon.

In the fall of 2011, there was a resurgence of interest over this phenomenon.

== Evaluation system by trust contract ==
André Antibi proposes an alternative system to avoid the constant macabre evaluation and sanction of students, named Assessment System Contract of Trust (EPCC). This evaluation system relies on a principle of coordination between the teacher and their students: "A week before a test, the teacher gives the examination's program to the student by selecting a list of exercises already corrected in class. The student only has to redo the exercises on test day and he gets a good note, having 'well learned'." The studies and experiments in situ of the method have shown that students who benefit from this method had the same level in national evaluations.

== Association ==
The association "Mouvement Contre La Constante Macabre" (Movement Against The Macabre Constant) is a non-profit association with the goal to fight this practice by raising the awareness of the public.

Since March 2009, this association is subventioned by the French ministry of education to pursue its mission.

Beginning from the 2011 school year, the French ministry of education produced an official circular letter of instructions, in which a first step towards the EPCC is initiated by advising that teachers should give a list of specific learning material to be reworked before a test.

== See also ==
- Pygmalion effect
- Sociology of education
