= Guilford–Zimmerman Temperament Survey =

Personality test

The Guilford–Zimmerman Temperament Survey (GZTS) is a personality test measuring normal personality developed by J. P. Guilford and Wayne S. Zimmerman in 1948. It is no longer widely available. The GZTS has been used in longitudinal studies, and was effective in tracking common personal developments over time, such as an increase in restraint, and an eventual decline in general activity.

The GZTS was also used in Italy to determine the most common personality profiles of their pilots in the military.
