= The Nature of Human Intelligence =

1967 book by J. P. Guilford

- Author: J. P. Guilford
- Subject: Human Intelligence
- Publication date: 1967

The Nature of Human Intelligence is a 1967 book by the American psychologist J. P. Guilford on human intelligence. It is an elaboration of Guilford's Structure of Intellect theory, where intelligence is a three-dimensional taxonomy of 120 elements.
