= Newcastle Personality Assessor =

Personality rest

The Newcastle Personality Assessor (NPA) is a personality test designed to measure the test-taker's personality on five dimensions: Extroversion, Neuroticism, Conscientious, Agreeableness, and Openness. The 10-questions assessor was developed by Daniel Nettle, a behavioral scientist at the Centre for Behaviour & Evolution, Newcastle University.
