= Personality and Preference Inventory =

Personality measure designed for the workplace

The Personality and Preference Inventory (PAPI) is a personality test that is used to determine a person's personality traits in the workplace. The questionnaire was designed to reveal a person's behaviours and preferences that may affect their suitability for various vocations or specific vacant positions. The test was originally designed by Max Kostick, Professor of Industrial Psychology at Boston State College, in the early 1960s. Since then, two test versions have been developed: the PAPI-I (Ipsative) for individuals and the PAPI-N (normative) for employers. Although the tests are widely used, there is some scholarly debate over their accuracy and usefulness in comparing potential job candidates.
