= Swedish Universities Scales of Personality =

Swedish Universities Scales of Personality is a personality test based on the older Karolinska Scales of Personality. It is available free of charge in Swedish or English. It is presented in t-score (mean 50 and standard deviation 10), includes 91 items and yields 13 personality scales:

- Somatic trait anxiety
- Psychic trait anxiety
- Stress susceptibility
- Lack of assertiveness
- Impulsiveness
- Adventure seeking
- Detachment
- Social desirability
- Embitterment
- Trait irritability
- Mistrust
- Verbal trait aggression
- Physical trait aggression

== See also ==
- Revised NEO Personality Inventory
- Temperament and Character Inventory
