= Progress testing =

Educational assessment

Progress tests are longitudinal, feedback-oriented educational assessment tools for the evaluation of development and sustainability of cognitive knowledge during a learning process. A progress test is a written knowledge exam (usually involving multiple choice questions) that is usually administered to all students in the "A" program at the same time and at regular intervals (usually twice to four times yearly) throughout the entire academic program. The test samples the complete knowledge domain expected of new graduates upon completion of their courses, regardless of the year level of the student. The differences between students’ knowledge levels show in the test scores; the further a student has progressed in the curriculum, the higher the scores. As a result, these resultant scores provide a longitudinal, repeated measures, curriculum-independent assessment of the objectives in knowledge of the entire program.

== History ==
Since its creation in the late 1970s at both Maastricht University and the University of Missouri–Kansas City, the progress test of applied knowledge has been used in medical and health sciences programs. It is used in medical education in both undergraduate and postgraduate medical education. It is used formatively and summatively.

== Use in academic programs ==
The progress test is currently used by national progress test consortia in the United Kingdom, Italy, the Netherlands, Germany, Austria, and in individual schools in Africa, Saudi Arabia, South East Asia, the Caribbean, Australia, New Zealand, Sweden, Finland, and the United States. The National Board of Medical Examiners in the United States also provides progress testing in various countries. The feasibility of an international approach to progress testing was first demonstrated by Albano et al. in 1996, who compared test scores across German, Dutch and Italian medical schools. An international consortium has been established in Canada involving faculties in Ireland, Australia, Canada, Portugal and the West Indies.

The progress test serves several functions in academic programs. Considerable empirical evidence from medical schools in the Netherlands, Canada, United Kingdom and Ireland, as well postgraduate medical studies and schools in dentistry and psychology have shown that the longitudinal feature of the progress test provides a unique and demonstrable measurement of the growth and effectiveness of students’ knowledge acquisition throughout their course of study.

As a result, this information can be consistently used for diagnostic, remedial and prognostic teaching and learning interventions. In the Netherlands, these interventions have been aided by the provision of a web-based results feedback system known as ProF in which students can compare their results with their peers across different total and subtotal score perspectives, both across and within universities.

Additionally, the longitudinal data can serve as a transparent quality assurance measure for program reviews by providing an evaluation of the extent to which a school is meeting its curriculum objectives. The test also provides more reliable data for high-stakes assessment decisions by using measures of continuous learning rather than a one-shot method. Inter-university progress testing collaborations provide a means of improving the cost-effectiveness of assessments by sharing a larger pool of items, item writers, reviewers, and administrators. The collaborative approach adopted by the Dutch and other consortia has enabled the progress test to become a benchmarking instrument by which to measure the quality of educational outcomes in knowledge. The success of the progress test in these ways has led to consideration of developing an international progress test.

== Advantages ==
Progress tests provide information derived from their comprehensive scope and combined cross-sectional and longitudinal design, which can be used to monitor individual learner development and to support curriculum evaluation.

Progress testing aims to improve long-term knowledge retention, as the repeated testing of the same comprehensive domain of knowledge removes the need to test for facts that may have been recently memorized. Instead, item content remains relevant long after the knowledge has been learned, and every new test occasion is a renewed opportunity to demonstrate growth of knowledge.

Progress testing also allows early detection of high achievers, and, depending on their performance, may allow for individualized accelerated curricula.

Progress testing provides strong benchmarking opportunities because progress tests are not limited to a single school or curricula, so evaluations can be used to compare graduates and the effectiveness of different curriculum approaches.

== Disadvantages ==
The required resources for test development and scoring and the need for a central organization are important disadvantages of progress testing, as well as the complexities of scoring and psychometric procedures for reducing test-difficulty variation and standard setting procedures. Furthermore, progress tests are ineffective in heterogeneous programs with early specialization, such as many health sciences programs.

== International programs using progress testing ==
International programs using progress testing since 2010 include, but are not limited to:

- University of Minho, School of Medicine, Portugal
- Netherlands Group: Groningen, Leiden, Maastricht, Nijmegen and Vrije Universiteit Amsterdam, Amsterdam, the Netherlands
- Ghent University, Belgium
- International Partnership for Progress Testing (IPPT) - undergraduate medical programs at McMaster University Medical School, Canada; University of Limerick, Ireland; University of Algarve, Portugal; University of Western Sydney, Australia
- Progress Test Medizin (PTM), Charité-Universitätsmedizin Berlin, Germany (Germany – Berlin, Aachen, Cologne, Münster, Witten, Duisburg-Essen, Oldenburg, Hamburg, Neuruppin, Düsseldorf, Augsburg, Bielefeld; Austria – Graz, Innsbruck, Vienna, Linz)
- NBME 1 (Barts, St. George’s London, Leeds and Queens University, Belfast UK)
- NBME 2 (University of South Florida and Case Western Reserve University)
- Southern Illinois University, Vanderbilt, University of New Mexico, Penn State, Texas Tech, Medical College of Georgia, University of Minnesota
- University of Manchester School of Medicine, Manchester, UK
- Peninsula College of Medicine and Dentistry, UK
- Cardiff University School of Medicine, Wales, UK
- Swansea University Medical School, Wales, UK
- University of Tampere, Finland
- University of Helsinki, Finland
- Karaganda State Medical University, Kazakhstan
- Otago Medical School, Otago, New Zealand
- Auckland Medical School, Auckland, New Zealand
- São Paulo City Medical School (UNICID), Brazil
- University of Indonesia Medical School, Indonesia
- Catholic University of Mozambique
- Pretoria, South Africa
- Syrian-Lebanese Hospital Institute for Education and Research - CMIRA Program, Brazil
- Alfaisal University - College of Medicine, Saudi Arabia
- The College of Medicine at King Saud bin Abdulaziz University for Health Sciences (KSAU-HS), Saudi Arabia
- The College of Dentistry at King Saud bin Abdulaziz University for Health Sciences (KSAU-HS), Saudi Arabia
- Batterjee Medical College for Senescences & Technology, Jeddah, Saudi Arabia
- Sulaiman Alrajhi Colleges - School of Medicine, Albukairiyah city, Saudi Arabia
- King Fisal University - College of Medicine, Al-Ahsaa, Saudi Arabia
- Flinders University - School of Medicine (post-graduate), Adelaide, Australia
- Royal College of Surgeons in Ireland, Dublin, Ireland
- Royal College of Surgeons in Ireland - Medical University of Bahrain, Busaiteen, Bahrain

== See also ==
- Medical education

Alfaisal University
