= Peter Richard Killeen =

American psychologist (born 1942)

Peter R. Killeen
- Born: 1942 (age 83–84); Orange, New Jersey
- Education: Harvard University
- Scientific career
- Fields: Psychology
- Thesis: Preference for schedules of reinforcement (1969)

Peter Richard Killeen (born 1942) is an American psychologist known for his work in quantitative analysis of behavior, behavioral timing, learning theory, reinforcement theory, memory research, and discounting of delayed and probabilistic rewards. He is Professor Emeritus of Psychology at Arizona State University.

== Early life and education ==
Killeen was born in Orange, New Jersey, in 1942. He received a bachelor's degree in psychology from Michigan State University in 1964 and earned a Ph.D. in experimental psychology from Harvard University in 1969.

== Academic career ==
Killeen joined the faculty of Arizona State University after completing his doctoral studies. He became Professor of Psychology in 1978and later served as chair of the Department of Psychology from 1979 to 1983. He also directed Arizona State University's Experimental and Physiological Psychology Program during multiple terms, including 1976–1979 and 1989–1992.

== Research ==
His work has contributed to mathematical and theoretical models in behavior analysis and experimental psychology. Together with J. Gregor Fetterman, Killeen developed a behavioral theory of timing published in ''Psychological Review'' in 1988. The theory examined timing processes in animals and humans and became one of several quantitative models used in the study of temporal behavior.

His work on reinforcement theory included the development of mathematical models describing response strength, motivation, and reinforcement schedules. Killeen examined statistical inference and replication in psychological science. His 2005 article "An alternative to null hypothesis significance tests" argued for approaches emphasising replication probability and effect estimation.

== Professional service ==
Killeen served as president of the Society for Quantitative Analyses of Behavior from 1999 to 2002 and later served as president of the Association for Behavior Analysis International from 2019 to 2020. He has served on the editorial boards of several academic journals, including ''Psychological Review'', ''Journal of the Experimental Analysis of Behavior'', ''Behavioural Processes'' and ''Psychonomic Bulletin.

== Honors and recognition ==
Killeen has been elected Fellow of the American Psychological Association, the Association for Psychological Science and the Association for Behavior Analysis International.

== Selected publications ==
- Killeen, P. R. (1975). "On the temporal control of behavior." Psychological Review. doi:10.1037/h0076774
- Killeen, P. R., & Fetterman, J. G. (1988). "A behavioral theory of timing." Psychological Review.doi:10.1037/0033-295X.95.2.274
- Killeen, P. R. (1994). "Mathematical principles of reinforcement." Behavioral and Brain Sciences.doi:10.1017/S0140525X00033609
- Killeen, P. R. (2005). "An alternative to null hypothesis statistical tests." Psychological Science.doi:10.1111/j.0956-7976.2005.01538.x
- Killeen, P. R. (2006). "Beyond statistical inference: A decision theory for science." Psychonomic Bulletin & Review.doi:10.3758/BF03193962
- Killeen, P. R., Russell, V. A., & Sergeant, J. A. (2013). "A behavioral neuroenergetics theory of ADHD." Neuroscience & Biobehavioral Reviews. doi:10.1016/j.neubiorev.2013.02.011
- Killeen, P. R. (2023). "Variations on a theme by Rachlin: Probability discounting." Journal of the Experimental Analysis of Behavior, pp. 140–155. doi:10.1002/jeab.817
