= Confidence-based learning =

Learning system

Confidence-based learning is a system of learning.

== History ==
The confidence-based learning is a culmination of more than 70 years of academic, commercial, and governmental research into the connection between confidence, correctness, retention, and learning. The first academic paper on the subject was written in 1932.

The framework for confidence-based learning is based primarily around the research of Darwin Hunt, Dieudonne LeClerq, Emir Shuford, and James E. Bruno.

== See also ==
- Concept inventory – Knowledge assessment tool
- Psychometrics – Theory and technique of psychological measurement
