= Sten scores =

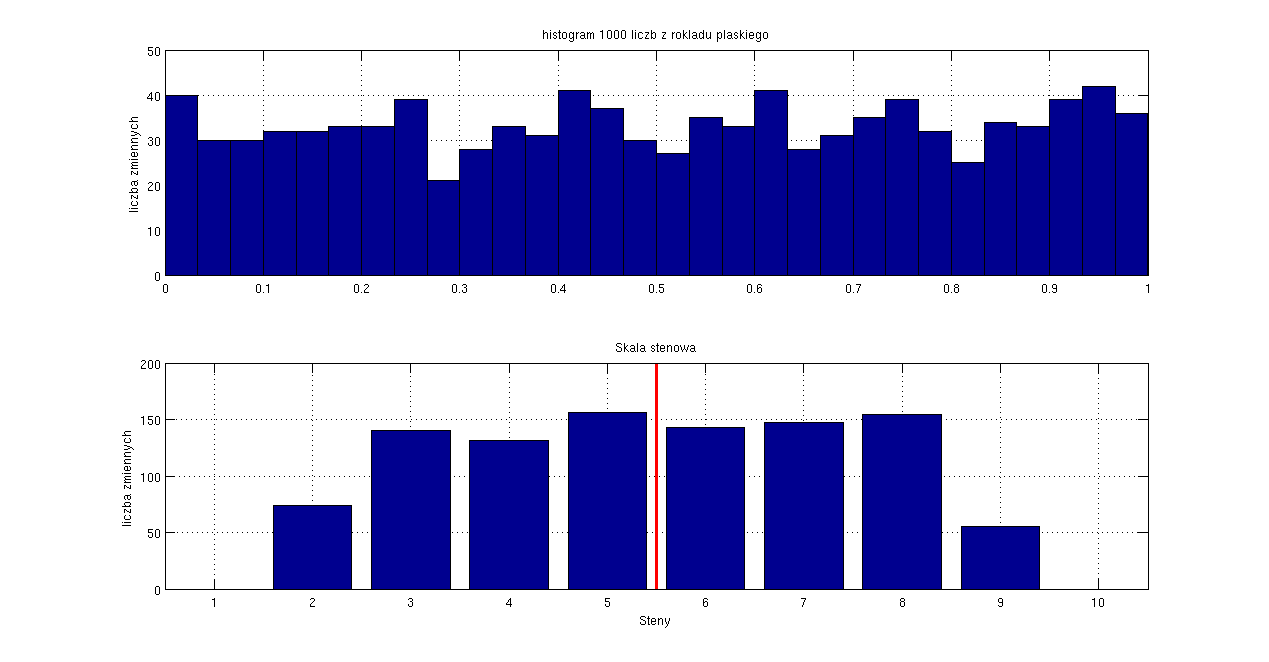
Example

The results of some psychometric instruments or tests are given as sten scores (a score between 1 and 10) sten being an abbreviation for 'Standard Ten' and thus closely related to stanine scores.

== Definition ==
A sten score indicates an individual's approximate position (as a range of values) with respect to the population of values and, therefore, to other people in that population. The individual sten scores are defined by reference to a standard normal distribution. Unlike stanine scores, which have a midpoint of five, sten scores have no midpoint (the midpoint is the value 5.5). Like stanines, individual sten scores are demarcated by half standard deviations. Thus, a sten score of 5 includes all standard scores from -.5 to zero and is centered at -0.25 and a sten score of 4 includes all standard scores from -1.0 to -0.5 and is centered at -0.75. A sten score of 1 includes all standard scores below -2.0. Sten scores of 6-10 "mirror" scores 5-1. The table below shows the standard scores that define stens and the percent of individuals drawn from a normal distribution that would receive sten score.

Standard/z scores, percentages, percentiles, and sten scores
z-scores	< −2.0	−2.0 … −1.5	−1.5 … −1.0	−1.0 … −0.5	−0.5 … −0.0	+0.0 … +0.5	+0.5 … +1.0	+1.0 … +1.5	+1.5 … +2.0	> +2.0
Percent	2.28%	4.41%	9.18%	14.99%	19.15%	19.15%	14.99%	9.18%	4.41%	2.28%
Percentile	1.14	4.48	11.27	23.36	40.43	59.57	76.64	88.73	95.52	98.86
Sten	1	2	3	4	5	6	7	8	9	10

Percentiles are the percentile of the sten score (which is the mid-point of a range of z-scores).

Sten scores (for the entire population of results) have a mean of 5.5 and a standard deviation of 2.

== Calculation of sten scores ==
When the score distribution is approximately normally distributed, sten scores can be calculated by a linear transformation: (1) the scores are first standardized; (2) then multiplied by the desired standard deviation of 2; and finally, (3) the desired mean of 5.5 is added. The resulting decimal value may be used as-is or rounded to an integer.

For example, suppose that scale scores are found to have a mean of 23.5, a standard deviation of 4.2, and to be approximately normally distributed. Then sten scores for this scale can be calculated using the formula, $\frac {(s - 23.5)}{4.2} 2 + 5.5$. It is also usually necessary to truncate such scores, particularly if the scores are skewed.

An alternative method of calculation requires that the scale developer prepare a table to convert raw scores to sten scores by apportioning percentages according to the distribution shown in the table. For example, if the scale developer observes that raw scores 0-3 comprise 2% of the population, then these raw scores will be converted to a sten score of 1 and a raw score of 4 (and possibly 5, etc.) will be converted to a sten score of 2. This procedure is a non-linear transformation that will normalize the sten scores and usually the resulting stens will only approximate the percentages shown in the table. The 16PF Questionnaire uses this scoring method.
