= Stanine =

Method of scaling test scores

Stanine (STAndard NINE) is a method of scaling test scores on a nine-point standard scale with a mean of five and a standard deviation of two.

Some web sources attribute stanines to the U.S. Army Air Forces during World War II. Psychometric legend has it that a 1–9 scale was used because of the compactness of recording the score as a single digit but Thorndike claims that by reducing scores to just nine values, stanines "reduce the tendency to try to interpret small score differences (p. 131)". The earliest known use of stanines was by the U.S. Army Air Forces in 1942.

== Calculation ==
Test scores are scaled to stanine scores using the following algorithm:

1. Rank results from lowest to highest
2. Give the lowest 4% a stanine of 1, the next 7% a stanine of 2, etc., according to the following table:

Calculating Stanines
Bracketed proportion	4%	7%	12%	17%	20%	17%	12%	7%	4%
Stanine	1	2	3	4	5	6	7	8	9
Standardized score	below −1.75	−1.75 to −1.25	−1.25 to −0.75	−0.75 to −0.25	−0.25 to +0.25	+0.25 to +0.75	+0.75 to +1.25	+1.25 to +1.75	above +1.75
Wechsler scale score	below 74	74 to 81	81 to 89	89 to 96	96 to 104	104 to 111	111 to 119	119 to 126	above 126
Cumulative proportion	4%	11%	23%	40%	60%	77%	89%	96%	100%

The underlying basis for obtaining stanines is that a normal distribution is divided into nine intervals, each of which has a width of 0.5 standard deviations excluding the first and last, which are just the remainder (the tails of the distribution). The median lies at the centre of the fifth interval.

== Use today ==
Today stanines are mostly used in educational assessment.

- The University of Alberta in Edmonton, Alberta, Canada used the stanine system until 2003, when it switched to a 4-point scale.
- In the United States, the Educational Records Bureau (they administer the "ERBs") reports test scores as stanines and percentiles.
- In Europe, EUROCONTROL scores its FEAST Test - a test used for selecting candidates for ATC - using stanines.
- The New Zealand Council for Educational Research uses stanines.
- GL Assessment use stanines alongside SAS (Standardised Age Scores) to express the results of its CAT4 assessments, used in many UK and British international schools
- The Otis-Lennon School Ability Test uses a stanine system along with percentiles.
- High schools in Korea use a stanine system to evaluate their students.
- The IDF (Israeli Defense Force) uses the stanine grading system ranging from 10 to 90 (10, 20, 30 and so on) to rank intelligence ability relevant to the army's use, determined by a 100 question test divided to 4 categories having to do with different uses and implications of cognitive abilities
- The Polish Matura secondary-school exam results and university admissions utilise the stanine system

== See also ==
- Sten scores – a similar system, but with 10 possible values
- Normal score
