= Criterion-referenced test =

A criterion-referenced test is a style of test that uses test scores to generate a statement about the behavior that can be expected of a person with that score. Most tests and quizzes that are written by school teachers can be considered criterion-referenced tests. In this case, the objective is simply to see whether the student has learned the material. Criterion-referenced assessment can be contrasted with norm-referenced assessment and ipsative assessment.

Criterion-referenced testing was a major focus of psychometric research in the 1970s.

== Definition of criterion ==
A common misunderstanding regarding the term is the meaning of criterion. Many, if not most, criterion-referenced tests involve a cutscore, where the examinee passes if their score exceeds the cutscore and fails if it does not (often called a mastery test). The criterion is not the cutscore; the criterion is the domain of subject matter that the test is designed to assess. For example, the criterion may be "Students should be able to correctly add two single-digit numbers," and the cutscore may be that students should correctly answer a minimum of 80% of the questions to pass.

The criterion-referenced interpretation of a test score identifies the relationship to the subject matter. In the case of a mastery test, this does mean identifying whether the examinee has "mastered" a specified level of the subject matter by comparing their score to the cutscore. However, not all criterion-referenced tests have a cutscore, and the score can simply refer to a person's standing on the subject domain. The ACT is an example of this; there is no cutscore, it simply is an assessment of the student's knowledge of high-school level subject matter.

Because of this common misunderstanding, criterion-referenced tests have also been called standards-based assessments by some education agencies, as students are assessed with regard to standards that define what they "should" know, as defined by the state.

== Comparison of criterion-referenced, domain-referenced and norm-referenced tests ==
Sample scoring for the history question: What caused World War II?
| Student answers | Criterion-referenced assessment | Norm-referenced assessment |
|---|---|---|
| Student #1: World War II was caused by Hitler and Germany invading Poland. | This answer is correct. | This answer is worse than Student #2's answer, but better than Student #3's answer. |
| Student #2: World War II was caused by multiple factors, including the Great Depression and the general economic situation, the rise of nationalism, fascism, and imperialist expansionism, and unresolved resentments related to World War I. The war in Europe began with the German invasion of Poland. | This answer is correct. | This answer is better than Student #1's and Student #3's answers. |
| Student #3: World War II was caused by the assassination of Archduke Ferdinand. | This answer is wrong. | This answer is worse than Student #1's and Student #2's answers. |

Both terms criterion-referenced and norm-referenced were originally coined by Robert Glaser. Unlike a criterion-reference test, a norm-referenced test indicates whether the test-taker did better or worse than other people who took the test. For example, if the criterion is "Students should be able to correctly add two single-digit numbers," then reasonable test questions might look like "$2+3 = ?$" or "$9+5 = ?$" A criterion-referenced test would report the student's performance strictly according to whether the individual student correctly answered these questions. A norm-referenced test would report primarily whether this student correctly answered more questions compared to other students in the group. Even when testing similar topics, a test which is designed to accurately assess mastery may use different questions than one which is intended to show relative ranking. This is because some questions are better at reflecting actual achievement of students, and some test questions are better at differentiating between the best students and the worst students. (Many questions will do both.) A criterion-referenced test will use questions which were correctly answered by students who know the specific material. A norm-referenced test will use questions which were correctly answered by the "best" students and not correctly answered by the "worst" students (e.g. Cambridge University's pre-entry 'S' paper). Some tests can provide useful information about both actual achievement and relative ranking. The ACT provides both a ranking, and indication of what level is considered necessary to likely success in college. Some argue that the term "criterion-referenced test" is a misnomer, since it can refer to the interpretation of the score as well as the test itself. In the previous example, the same score on the ACT can be interpreted in a norm-referenced or criterion-referenced manner.

Domain-referenced test is similar to criterion-referenced test, it is an assessment that covers a specific area of study such that a score will reveal how much of this area has been mastered. Thus, if an individual got 90% of the items correct in a domain-referenced or criterion-referenced test, this would be a high score indicative of his or her deep knowledge and understanding of the content covered in the test. These kinds of tests are contrasted with norm-referenced tests, in which scores indicate how well a test taker performed on the items relative to others who took the test.

== Relationship to high-stakes testing ==
Many high-profile criterion-referenced tests are also high-stakes tests, where the results of the test have important implications for the individual examinee. Examples of this include high school graduation examinations and licensure testing where the test must be passed to work in a profession, such as to become a pilot or attorney. However, being a high-stakes test is not specifically a feature of a criterion-referenced test. It is instead a feature of how an educational or government agency chooses to use the results of the test. It is moreover an individual type of test.

== Examples ==
- Driving tests are criterion-referenced tests, because their goal is to see whether the test taker is skilled enough to be granted a driver's license, not to see whether one test taker is more skilled than another test taker.
- Citizenship tests are usually criterion-referenced tests, because their goal is to see whether the test taker is sufficiently familiar with the new country's history and government, not to see whether one test taker is more knowledgeable than another test taker.

== See also ==
- Concept inventory
- Constructive alignment
- Educational assessment
- Ipsative assessment
- Norm-referenced assessment
- Psychometrics
- Standardized test
