= Knowledge survey =

A knowledge survey is a method of evaluating the delivery of a course through the gathering of feedback from the learner on the level of the knowledge they acquired after the completion of the instruction. It usually consists of questions that cover the content of the course. The surveys evaluate student learning and content mastery at all levels: from basic knowledge and comprehension through higher levels of thinking. Knowledge surveys can serve as both formative and summative assessment tools. They are effective in helping:

- students learn
- students develop metacognitive self-assessment skills required for self-efficacy
- instructors improve course organization
- promote clarity and disclosure
- departments align curricula and pedagogies to promote intellectual development.

== Structure of the survey ==
A standard knowledge survey consists of questions that cover the content of a course addressing all levels of Bloom's scale of thinking. A survey may include as many as 200 questions. The key feature of knowledge surveys is that students do NOT answer the questions. Instead, they say whether they COULD answer the question and with what degree of confidence. So students complete the surveys quickly.

For easy assessment, the questions might follow the multiple choice format with choices that address the level of knowledge and confidence in a certain topic. For example, a typical multiple choice self-assessment of an item expressing a challenge could take the following form:

- (A) I can address the item quite well with my present knowledge and skills.
- (B) I know at least 50% of the topic partially, and I know where I can find more information about it. Within 20 minutes, I am confident I can find the required resources to enable a complete answer.
- (C) I am not confident that I can answer the question at this time for graded test purposes.
