= Academic equivalency evaluation =

An academic equivalency evaluation is an analytical report which determines the equivalency in the United States educational system of a potential US immigrant's foreign academic and professional credentials. This evaluation determines the level of education and number of years completed, as well as the field of specialization. Academic evaluations consider the educational system of the foreign country, the quality of the university attended by the candidate, the credit hours and number of years of coursework, the nature of the courses, and the grades attained in the courses.

== Uses ==
An academic equivalency evaluation is primarily required for H-1B visa applicants who have not earned an academic degree at a university or college in the United States, but have acquired a degree from another country. H-1B visas require a bachelor's degree or its equivalent as a minimum. Academic equivalency evaluations provide the equivalent basis the United States Citizenship and Immigration Services accepts in order to apply for an H-1B visa. Academic equivalency evaluations can also be used towards other visas such as TN status, E-3, L-1B, Green Card, and I-140.

== Documents Required ==
Companies that provide academic equivalency evaluations typically require copies of any diplomas, transcripts, and post-graduate degrees, that a candidate may have. Academic degrees that can be evaluated may include, but not limited to; bachelor's degrees, master's degrees, or Ph.D., etc.
