= Competency evaluation (language) =

Measuring language proficiency

In applied linguistics and educational psychology, competency evaluation is a means of determining the language proficiency of an individual without the requirement for standardized testing.

Usually this includes a portfolio assessment. In language testing, it may also include student interviews and checklists (e.g., on a scale from 1 to 5 the student or teacher rates their ability to do such tasks as introducing one's family).

== Uses ==
While various governments in Europe and Canada often employ competency evaluation to evaluate bilingual abilities of public employees, it has only recently begun to receive attention from the United States where large testing corporations have dominated language evaluation with financially lucrative performance tests such as the TOEFL, MCAT and SAT tests. In psychology, competency can be evaluation to cover civil affairs, such as competency to handle personal finances, and competency to handle personal affairs (such as signing contracts).
