= Classroom walkthrough =

Mode of professional development for teachers

Classroom walkthrough is a mode of professional development for teachers. Clinical supervision, or the practice of classroom observation and feedback, has been one of the most often used tool in evaluating teacher performance, but the extent to which it helps teachers to improve their instruction is questionable. As a result, the "classroom walkthrough", designed for the purpose not of evaluation but of professional development, has gained increasing popularity.

== Instructional leadership ==
Instructional leadership is critical to the improvement of teaching and learning and plays a significant role with student achievement. For schools to respond and adapt, systems must exist that create the capacity to collectively process and apply knowledge about teaching and learning. Learning within a school is fostered when a group can identify a problem, and create a plan to collectively solve it.

== Walkthrough model ==
The walkthrough model, derived from Hewlett-Packard’s supervisory practice of Management By Wandering Around, has been portrayed as an effective and efficient system to collect data regarding instructional practices and provide feedback. Elliot Eisner suggests that to be effective, leaders must spend one third of their time in classrooms, and when principals spend more time in classrooms, teachers report a positive perception of the principal. For teacher quality to improve, Sergiovanni states that leadership is the key. School improvement relies heavily on the working relationship between instructional leaders and teachers. The success of the organization is sustained when the leaders serve as teachers for others.

The classroom walkthrough model consists of a series of frequent classroom visits where the observer(s) are present to look for predetermined evidence of specific practices. The observations last anywhere from two to forty-five minutes, and are intended to support the faculty in the delivery of instruction and curriculum. Carolyn Downey is known for her early work in the development of the classroom walkthrough model, however, there are several models available and some school districts have created their own. The aim of the classroom walkthrough is to provide direct and specific feedback to teachers based on the snapshot observed. The feedback can then be given to an individual, or the observer may provide a report of patterns noted during the walkthroughs. According to the National Staff Development Council, walkthroughs, sometimes referred to as "learning walks," provide the opportunity to:

- Reinforce attention to instructional practices
- Gather data about instructional practice and student learning
- Stimulate collegial conversation about teaching and learning
- Learn from other participants
- Deepen understandings and improve practices through continuous feedback

== Definitions ==
Classroom Walkthrough - an organized observation that requires the principal or supervisor to frequently visit classrooms to look for specific instructional practices.

Debriefing the Faculty - general feedback provided to the entire faculty that focuses on what to present in the school, and not an individual teacher

Downey Walkthrough Model - Short, focused, informal observations; time for reflection: a focus on curriculum and instruction; occasional follow-up; and informal collaborative process.

Look-fors - a precise indicator of teaching strategies that tell the observer what the strategy looks like when applied to the classroom
