= Ipsative =

Attribute of a survey scoring scale

In psychology, ipsative questionnaires (/ˈɪpsətɪv/; from Latin: ipse, 'of the self') are those where the sum of scale scores from each respondent adds to a constant value. Sometimes called a forced-choice scale, this measure contrasts Likert-type scales in which respondents score—often from 1 to 5—how much they agree with a given statement (see also norm-referenced test).

== In psychology ==
While mean scores from Likert-type scales can be compared across individuals, scores from an ipsative measure cannot. To explain, if an individual was equally extraverted and conscientious and was assessed on a Likert-type scale, each trait would be evaluated singularly, i.e. respondents would see the item "I enjoy parties" and agree or disagree with it to whatever degree reflected their preferences.

If the same traits were evaluated on an ipsative measure, respondents would be forced to choose between the two, i.e. a respondent would see the item "Which of these do you agree with more strongly? a) I like parties. b) I keep my work space neat and tidy." Ipsative measures may be more useful for evaluating traits within an individual, whereas Likert-type scales are more useful for evaluating traits across individuals.

Additionally, ipsative measures may be useful in identifying faking. However, ipsative measures may, especially among testing-naïve individuals exhibiting high levels of conscientiousness and/or neuroticism, decrease test validity by discouraging response and/or encouraging non-response. For example, a test's authors may force respondents to choose between "a) Animals chase me in my dreams" and "b) My dreams are nice" in an effort to see whether a given respondent is more inclined toward "faking bad" or toward "faking good." When faced with such a question, a child frequently terrified by nightmares that rarely if ever involve animals, and especially one whose parents have taught him/her strict rules against lying, may simply refuse to answer the question given that for that respondent nearly all of the time both descriptions are inaccurate. Even a previously presented guideline "Choose the answer that [best/better] describes you" may be unhelpful in such a situation to responders who worry that endorsing one item or the other will still involve stating it to be accurate or "well"-descriptive to some positive degree. Only if the guideline is presented as "Choose the answer that more accurately or less inaccurately describes you" and the above-described responder is sophisticated enough to reason out his/her response in terms of "Despite the infrequency with which I have nice dreams, I have them [more frequently / less infrequently] than dreams in which animals chase me" (or, in theory, vice versa) will such a responder be willing to answer the question—and phrasing the guideline in this way bears its own cost of making the question reveal less about the respondent's propensities because the respondent is no longer forced to "fake" one way or another.

== In education ==
In education, ipsative assessment is the practice of assessing present performance against the prior performance of the person being assessed. One place where this might be implemented is in reference to tests used with K-12 students in the United States, where value-added modeling of teacher performance is currently popular.

Ipsative assessment can be contrasted with criterion-referenced assessment and norm-referenced assessment. Ipsative assessment is used in everyday life, and features heavily in physical education and also in computer games. Encouraging pupils to beat their previous scores can take peer pressure out of situations and eliminates the competitive element associated with norm-based referencing. It can be particularly useful for children with learning disabilities and can improve motivation.

== See also ==
- Concept inventory
- Criterion-referenced assessment
- Norm-referenced assessment
- Psychological assessment
- Psychometrics
- Standardized test
- Two-alternative forced choice
