= List of secondary school leaving qualifications =

A secondary school leaving qualification is a document signifying that the holder has fulfilled any secondary education requirements of their locality, often including the passage of a final qualification examination.

For each leaving certificate student, they obtain a certain number of points coinciding with the results they received in their examinations. These results will then determine the qualifications of the student; Whether they get into university or whether they have to have an alternative method into what they wish to study.

== Africa ==
=== East Africa ===
- Kenya - Kenya Certificate of Secondary Education (KCSE)
- Uganda - Advanced Certificate of Education
- Tanzania - Certificate of Secondary Education Examination (C.S.E.E)

=== West Africa ===
- West Africa - West African Senior School Certificate Examination (WASSCE)
- Nigeria - National Examination Council (NECO)
- Tunisia - Baccalauréat

=== South Africa ===
- South Africa - National Senior Certificate (NSC) and National Certificate (Vocational) (NCV).
- Zimbabwe -
  - ZIMSEC GCE Advanced Level
  - ZIMSEC GCE Ordinary Level, a prerequisite to the GCE Advanced Level.
- Eswatini - Eswatini General Certificate of Secondary Education (EGCSE)

== Americas ==
=== United States and Canada ===
- United States - US schools do not typically have a leaving exam, but they do exist. For a general resource on exit exams at different levels in the US, see this page on exit examinations. Most US high schools use a High School Diploma to designate successful completion of the secondary school requirements of their locality.
  - General Educational Development (GED) credential for non-diploma holders
  - New York State - Regents Diploma
- Canada - Canadian High School Diploma Formerly the Canadian Diploma Certificate of Education (CDCE)
  - Diplôme des études secondaires Formerly Quebec High School/Secondary Certificate and québécois baccalaureat
  - Canadian high school examinations

=== South America ===
- Brazil - The Exame Nacional do Ensino Médio, shortened as Enem, is a non-mandatory, standardized Brazilian national exam, which evaluates high school students in Brazil. Recently, the exam has been used both as an admission test for enrollment in 68 federal universities and 26 educational institutes, as well as for certification for a high school degree.

== Asia ==
=== East Asia ===
- China - National Higher Education Entrance Examination
- Hong Kong - Hong Kong Diploma of Secondary Education
- Taiwan - National College Entrance Subject Aptitude Examination
- Japan - Certificate for Students Achieving the Proficiency Level of Upper Secondary School Graduates

=== Central Asia ===
- Uzbekistan - Final State Certification

=== South Asia ===
- Bangladesh -
  - Higher Secondary School Certificate (HSC) (12th grade)
  - Secondary School Certificate (SSC) (10th grade)
- Pakistan -
  - Secondary school leaving exam (SSC) which is equivalent to 10th grade
  - Higher Secondary School Certificate (HSC) which is equivalent to 12th grade

-insert here-

- Nepal -
  - Secondary Education Examination (10th Grade)
  - School Leaving Certificate Examination (12th Grade)
- Sri Lanka -
  - General Certificate of Education (GCE) O-Level
  - General Certificate of Education (GCE) A-level
- India -
  - In India, the education curricula is managed by multiple governing bodies, known as a Board, at the national level by non-domestic national boards such as IB, IGCSE and domestic national boards such as CISCE and CBSE. Both the national, and the regional educational Boards in the States of India are entrusted in conducting examinations at the Tenth grade and Twelfth grade levels. These pivotal examinations are generally referred to as the Board Examination , as these examinations are conducted by the educational Board rather than a school. The Council of Boards of School Education (COBSE) is the unified Educational Board Association in India, whose members are the various state Boards, and both the non-domestic and domestic national Boards, which are approved by the Ministry of Education of Government of India. The members have the right to conduct Board examinations in India. The layman term of 'Board Examination' are named differently according to the conducting Board.
  - Under the Central Board of Secondary Education (CBSE) based in New Delhi,
    - All India Senior School Certificate Examination (AISSCE) or sometimes called Senior Secondary Certificate Examination SSCE for 12th grade
    - All India Secondary School Examination (AISSE) or sometimes called Secondary School Examination for 10th grade
  - Under CISCE the only Non-Governmental National level Educational Board conducts 10th grade Indian Certificate of Secondary Education (ICSE) and Twelfth grade Indian School Certificate (ISC) Examination
  - The following are some of the state boards that offer a regional-focussed education. Regional boards are sometimes considered sub-par in comparison to their national level equivalents. However, there is no tangible proof of credibility of any of the educational boards in India.In Multiple State For Grade 10 Secondary School Certificate (SSC) or Secondary School Leaving Examination (SSLC) OR For Grade 12 Higher Secondary Certificate (HSC) Examination Are there
  - In Maharashtra State Board of Secondary and Higher Secondary Education - School Leaving Diploma offered by state government of Maharashtra.
  - In the State of Assam, India. Assam Higher Secondary Education Council (AHSEC) conducts 12th grade Examination and Board of Secondary Education Assam (SEBA) conducts 10th grade Examinations - School Leaving Diploma offered by state government of Assam
  - In the State of West Bengal West Bengal Council of Higher Secondary Education (WBCHSE) conducts 12th grade Examinations and West Bengal Board of Secondary Education (WBSE) conducts 10th grade Examination
  - In the State of Karnataka The Karnataka Secondary Education Examination Board (KSSEB) Conducts the SSC Examination for Class 10 and conducts HSC Examinations called as the 2nd PUC Examination.
  - Tamil Nadu, India - Higher Secondary Certificate (HSC) School Leaving Diploma offered by the Tamil Nadu state Govt And State Board of School Examinations (Sec.) & Board of Higher Secondary Examinations, Tamil Nadu (SBSEBHSE) also known as State Common Board of School Education, also conducts 10th grade & 12th grade Examinations
  - There are Total of 80 recognised educational board according to COBSE There are 3 National Level Boards ,9 Foreign Educational Board and remaining 78 State Educational Board.

=== Southeast Asia ===
- Malaysia - Sijil Pelajaran Malaysia - Malaysian Certificate of Education or International Baccalaureate Diploma or Cambridge A Levels
- Singapore - Singapore-Cambridge GCE Advanced Level or International Baccalaureate Diploma or NUS High School of Mathematics and Science Diploma
- Vietnam - High School Graduation Examination (TNTHPT – Kỳ thi tốt nghiệp trung học phổ thông)

=== Middle East ===
- Israel - Bagrut certificate
- Iraq - Iraqi Baccalaureate Diploma (Scientific or Art Branch) Higher Secondary School Certificate (HSC) (12th grade)

== Europe ==
=== Pan-European ===
- European Baccalaureate

=== National ===
- Albania - Matura Shtetërore
- Austria - Maturazeugnis
- Bosnia and Herzegovina -
  - Diploma o završenoj Gimnaziji
  - Diploma o završenoj srednjoj školi
  - Svjedodžba o maturi
  - Svjedodžba o završnom srednjem obrazovanju
- Bulgaria - Matura
- Croatia -
  - Svjedodžba o maturi
  - Svjedodžba o završnom srednjem obrazovanju
- Czech Republic - Maturita
- Finland - Ylioppilastutkinto - Studentexamen
- France - Baccalauréat
- Germany - Abitur
- Greece - Απολυτήριο (Apolytirio)
- Hungary - Érettségi
- Iceland - Stúdentspróf
- Ireland - Leaving Certificate (Ardteistiméireacht)
- Italy - Maturità, granting the Diploma (qualified by the type of school: di liceo, di istituto tecnico or di istituto professionale)
- Kosovo - Matura
- Netherlands - Voorbereidend wetenschappelijk onderwijs (VWO)
  - Hoger Algemeen Vormend Onderwijs (havo)
  - Voorbereidend Middelbaar Beroepsonderwijs (VMBO)
- North Macedonia - Matura
- Spain - Bachillerato
  - Pruebas de Acceso a Estudios Universitarios (commonly called "Selectividad") when entering university
- Poland - Matura
- Romania - Bacalaureat
- Russia - Unified State Exam
- Serbia - Matura
- Slovakia - Maturitné vysvedčenie
- Slovenia - Matura
- Switzerland - Matura
- Ukraine - Matura
- United Kingdom -
  - General Certificate of Education (GCE) A-level
  - AQA Baccalaureate, a qualification earned by combining A-levels
  - Edexcel Diploma, a qualification earned by combining A-levels
    - General Certificate of Secondary Education (GCSE), a prerequisite to the A-levels
  - BTEC Extended Diploma
  - Access to HE Diploma
  - Historical:
    - School Certificate (England and Wales) (SC)
    - Higher School Certificate (England and Wales) (HSC)
    - 14–19 Diploma (England, Wales and Northern Ireland)
    - GCE Ordinary Level (O-Level)
    - Certificate of Secondary Education (CSE)
    - Cambridge Pre-U Diploma
  - Regional:
    - Wales - Welsh Baccalaureate
    - Scotland - National 5 Scottish Higher and Advanced Higher

== Oceania ==
- Australia -
  - Higher School Certificate
  - Victorian Certificate of Education/Victorian Pathways Certificate
  - Queensland Certificate of Education
  - South Australian Certificate of Education
  - Western Australian Certificate of Education
  - Tasmanian Certificate of Education
  - Australian Capital Territory Senior Secondary Certificate (ACT Year 12 Certificate until 2014)
  - Northern Territory Certificate of Education and Training
- New Zealand - National Certificate of Educational Achievement (NCEA)

== International ==
- International Baccalaureate Diploma (IB Diploma)
- Advanced Placement International Diploma (APID)
- Advanced International Certificate of Education (AICE)
  - International General Certificate of Secondary Education (IGCSE), a prerequisite to the AICE

== See also ==
- List of primary and secondary school tests
- List of admission tests to colleges and universities
