= Standardized testing in education =

Standardized testing in educational settings is used to measure student achievement and instructional effectiveness, as well as to make decisions. Although everyday classroom tests, if everyone is asked the same questions and their answers are graded the same way, are standardized tests, this is generally discussed in terms of externally created tests that are given at the end of a school year or at the end of high school. In some countries, passing a national exam is necessary to get a high school diploma or to be admitted to a university.

== Annual standardized tests at school ==
Standardized testing is a very common way of determining a student's past academic achievement and future potential.

The validity, quality, or use of tests, particularly annual standardized tests common in education have continued to be widely both supported or criticized. Like the tests themselves, supports and criticisms of tests are often varied and may come from a variety of sources such as parents, test takers, instructors, business groups, universities, or governmental watchdogs.

Supporters of large-scale standardized tests in education often provide the following reasons for promoting testing in education:

- Feedback or diagnosis of test taker's performance: Standardized tests allow teachers to see how their students are performing compared to others in the country. This will help them revise their teaching methods if necessary to help their students meet the standards. Students are given the opportunity to reflect on their scores and see where their strengths as well as weaknesses are. The scores can allow parents to get an idea about how their child is doing academically.
- Fair and efficient. Each test taker will have the same amount of time to complete the test. Every answer and overall grade for a standardized test is evaluated identically, therefore reducing potential bias in the scoring system.
- Promotes accountability: Standardized testing is used as a public policy strategy to establish stronger accountability measures for public education. The idea behind the standardized testing policy movement is that testing is the first step to improving schools, teaching practice, and educational methods through data collection. Proponents argue that the data generated by the standardized tests act like a report card for the community, demonstrating how well local schools are performing. Critics of the movement, however, point to various discrepancies that result from current state standardized testing practices, including problems with test validity and reliability and false correlations (see Simpson's paradox).
- Prediction and selection
- Improves performance

Critics of standardized tests in education often provide the following reasons for revising or removing standardized tests in education:

- Poor predictive quality.
- Grade inflation of test scores or grades.
- Culturally or socioeconomically biased.
- Psychologically damaging.
- Poor indicator of intelligence or ability.

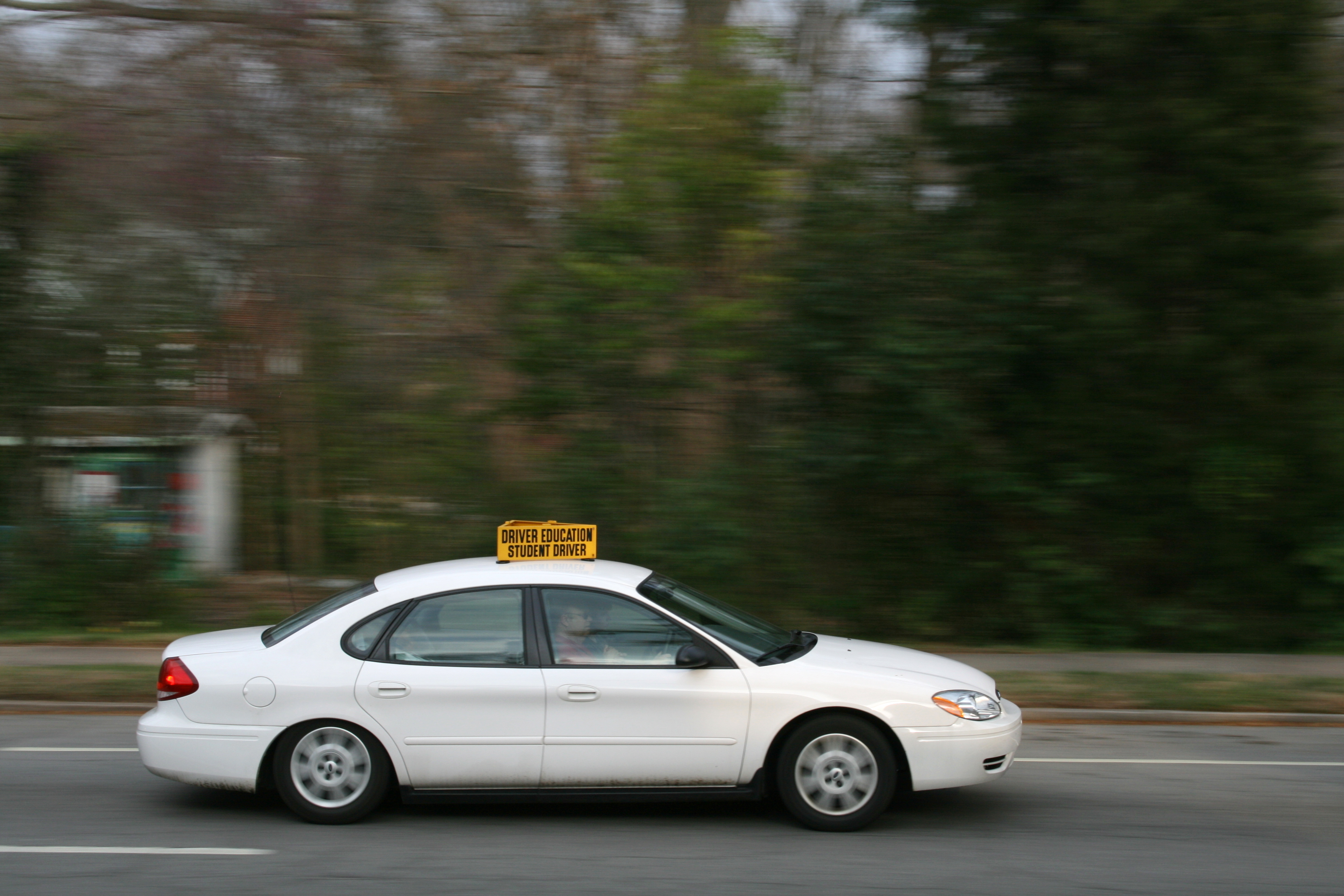
If a teacher knows that a particular subject, such as parallel parking, is not being tested, they may not choose to spend instruction time on that subject. This is true regardless of whether the test is standardized or not.

Furthermore, student's success is being tracked to a teacher's relative performance, making teacher advancement contingent upon a teacher's success with a student's academic performance. Ethical and economical questions arise for teachers when faced with clearly underperforming or under-skilled students and a standardized test.

In her book, Now You See It, Cathy Davidson criticizes standardized tests. She describes youth as "assembly line kids on an assembly line model," meaning the use of the standardized test as a part of a one-size-fits-all educational model. She also criticizes the narrowness of skills being tested and labeling children without these skills as failures or as students with disabilities. Widespread and organized cheating has been a growing culture.

There are three metrics by which the best performing countries in the TIMMS (the "A+ countries") are measured: focus, coherence, and rigor. Focus is defined as the number of topics covered in each grade; the idea is that the fewer topics covered in each grade, the more focus can be given to each topic. The definition of coherence is adhering to a sequence of topics covered that follows the natural progression or logical structure of mathematics. The CCSSM was compared to both the current state standards and the A+ country standards. With the most topics covered on average, the current state standards had the lowest focus. The Common Core Standards aim to fix this discrepancy by helping educators focus on what students need to learn instead of becoming distracted by extraneous topics. They encourage educational materials to go from covering a vast array of topics in a shallow manner to a few topics in much more depth.

=== Time and money ===
Standardized tests are a way to measure the education level of students and schools on a broad scale. From kindergarten to 12th grade, most American students participate in annual standardized tests. The average student takes about 10 of these tests per year (e.g., one or two reading comprehension tests, one or two math tests, a writing test, a science test, etc.). The average amount of testing takes about 2.3% of total class time (equal to about four school days per year).

In the US, the Elementary and Secondary Education Act is the largest K-12 federal education law, which provides education to disadvantaged children. The reauthorization of this Act in 2002 by President George W. Bush mandated annual mathematics and reading tests of students in third through eighth grade and the data from these tests would be available to parents, educators, administrators, and policymakers in the form of report cards.

Standardized tests are expensive to administer. It has been reported that the United States spends about US$1.7 billion annually on these tests. In 2001, it was also reported that only three companies (Harcourt Educational Measurement, CTB McGraw-Hill and Riverside Publishing) design 96% of the tests taken at the state level.

=== Educational decisions ===
The National Academy of Sciences recommends that major educational decisions not be based solely on a single test score. The use of minimum cut-scores for entrance or graduation does not imply a single standard, since test scores are nearly always combined with other minimal criteria such as number of credits, prerequisite courses, attendance, etc. Test scores are often perceived as the "sole criteria" simply because they are the most difficult, or the fulfillment of other criteria (such as taking enough English and math classes) is automatically assumed. One exception to this rule is the GED test, which has allowed many people to have their skills recognized even though they did not meet traditional criteria.

Some teachers say that a single standardized test only measures a student's current knowledge and it does not reflect the students progress from the beginning of the year.

=== Effects on disadvantaged students ===
Monty Neill, the director of the National Center for Fair and Open Testing, claims that students who speak English as a second language, who have a disability, or who come from low-income families are disproportionately denied a diploma due to a test score, which is unfair and harmful. In the late 1970s when the graduation test began in the United States, for example, a lawsuit claimed that many Black students had not had a fair opportunity on the material they were tested on the graduation test because they had attended schools segregated by law. "The interaction of under-resourced schools and testing most powerfully hits students of color", as Neill argues, "They are disproportionately denied diplomas or grade promotion, and the schools they attend are the ones most likely to fare poorly on the tests and face sanctions such as restructuring."

In the journal The Progressive, Barbara Miner explicates the drawbacks of standardized testing by analyzing three different books. As the co-director of the Center for Education at Rice University and a professor of education, Linda M. McNeil in her book Contradictions of School Reform: Educational Costs of Standardized Testing writes "Educational standardization harms teaching and learning and, over the long term, re-stratifies education by race and class." McNeil believes that test-based education reform places higher standards for students of color. According to Miner, McNeil "shows how test-based reform centralizes power in the hands of the corporate and political elite—a particularly frightening development during this time of increasing corporate and conservative influence over education reform." Such test-based reform has dumbed down learning, especially for students of color.

FairTest says that negative consequences of test misuse include pushing students out of school, driving teachers out of the profession, and undermining student engagement and school climate.

In his book, The Shame of the Nation, Jonathan Kozol argues that students submitted to standardized testing are victims of "cognitive decapitation". Kozol comes to this realization after speaking to many children in inner city schools who have no spatial recollection of time, time periods, and historical events. This is especially the case in schools where due to shortages in funding and strict accountability policies, schools have done away with subjects like the arts, history and geography; in order to focus on the content of the mandated tests.

== Standardized tests for high school graduation ==
The Indian CBSE Class 10 AISSE and Class 12 AISSCE Exam, commonly referred to as the "Board Exam'" are some of the largest standardized examinations. Around four to five million students attempt it every year – much more than US SAT exam – and comparable to the Chinese Gaokao Examination.

== Standardized tests in university admissions ==
Standardized tests are reviewed by universities as part of the application, along with other supporting evidence such as personal statements, high school grades, previous coursework, and letters of recommendation. Different countries have different tests, such as the SAT in the US, the Gaokao in China, and the Joint Entrance Examination in India.

Nathan Kuncel, a scholar of higher education, says that college admission tests and other standardized tests "help overwhelmed admissions officers divide enormous numbers of applicants into pools for further assessment. High scores don't guarantee admission anywhere, and low scores don't rule it out, but schools take the tests seriously."

Research shows that the tests predict more than just first-year grades and the level of courses a student is likely to take. The longitudinal research conducted by scientists shows that students with high test scores are more likely to take the challenging route through college.

Tests also can indicate the outcomes of students beyond college, including faculty evaluations, research accomplishments, degree attainment, performance on comprehensive exams and professional licensure.

Since grading varies across schools, and even for two students in the same school, the common measure provided by the test score is more useful as a way to compare students.

However, in 1995, the Graduate Record Examinations (GRE) scores accounted for just 6 percent of the variation in grades in graduate school. The GRE appeared to be "virtually useless from a prediction standpoint," wrote the authors. Repeated studies of the Law School Admissions Test (LSAT) find the same.

There is debate whether the test will indicate the long-term success in work and life since there are many other factors, but fundamental skills such as reading, writing, and math are related to job performance. Major life accomplishments, such as publishing a novel or patenting technology, are also associated with test scores, even after taking into account educational opportunities. There is even a sizable body of evidence that these skills are related to effective leadership and creative achievements at work. Being able to read texts and make sense of them and having strong quantitative reasoning are crucial in the modern information economy. Students who scored in the top 1% at the age of 13. Twenty years later, they were, on average, very highly accomplished, with high incomes, major awards and career accomplishments.

Many arguments suggest that skills from tests are useful—but only up to a point.

There is a correlation between test scores and social class, but success on standardized tests and in college is not simply dependent on class. The studies show that "the tests were valid even when controlling for socioeconomic class. Regardless of their family background, students with good tests scores and high-school grades do better in college than students with lower scores and weaker transcripts."

Another criticism relating to social class and standardized testing is that only wealthy people receive test preparation and coaching. However, test prep programs often result in an increase of 5 to 20 points (out of 1600), which is far below the "100 to 200 points claimed by some test prep companies."

Many people believe that standardized tests reduce diversity in admissions, since disadvantaged members of racial minority groups have, on average, lower test scores than other groups. A 2012 comparison of universities where admissions tests are optional for applicants and schools that use the tests showed that "recent research demonstrates that testing-optional schools have been enrolling increasingly diverse student bodies. But the same is true of schools that require testing." In 2025, comparisons found that testing-optional admissions disproportionately harmed high-achieving students from lower-income backgrounds.

Opponents claim that standardized tests are misused and uncritical judgments of intelligence and performance, but supporters argue that these are not negatives of standardized tests, but criticisms of poorly designed testing regimes. They argue that testing should and does focus educational resources on the most important aspects of education—imparting a pre-defined set of knowledge and skills—and that other aspects are either less important, or should be added to the testing scheme.

Evidence shows that black and Hispanic students score lower than whites and Asians on average. Therefore, the math and reading standard tests such as SAT have faced escalating attacks from progressives. However, a 2020 report found the tests are not discriminatory and play an important role in protecting educational quality. The report suggested that worsening grade inflation, especially at wealthy high schools, makes a standard assessment especially important.

Regarding UC schools' intention in dropping standard tests such as the SAT and ACT in college admissions, subjective and customized tests like essays and extra-curriculars can be easily tailored and detrimental to the students who are not familiar with the process. Admissions without testing may be even more tilted in favor of the well-connected.

In January 2020, the faculty senate at the University of California recommended that the UC system keep standardized tests as admissions requirements. The report says standardized math and reading tests are useful for predicting college performance. Based on data from the students in the UC system, the report concludes that "test scores are currently better predictors of first-year GPA than high school grade point average." The report continues: scores are also good at predicting total college GPA and the possibility a student will graduate. While the "predictive power of test scores has gone up," the report adds, "the predictive power of high school grades has gone down."

Test scores enable UC schools "to select those students from underrepresented groups who are more likely to earn higher grades and to graduate on time." "The original intent of the SAT was to identify students who came from outside relatively privileged circles who might have the potential to succeed in university," the report says. The SAT's maker, the Educational Testing Service (ETS), now claims the SAT is not an "aptitude" test but rather an assessment of "developed abilities".
