= Standards for Educational and Psychological Testing =

Educational testing standards

Standards for Educational and Psychological Testing (2014 Edition)

The Standards for Educational and Psychological Testing is a set of testing standards developed jointly by the American Educational Research Association (AERA), American Psychological Association (APA), and the National Council on Measurement in Education (NCME). The most recent edition, the 7th, is available in print format and is freely downloadable in PDF and ePub formats.

Sometimes referred to as "the Bible" of psychometricians and testing industry professionals, these standards represent operational best practice in validity, fairness, reliability, design, delivery, scoring, and use of tests. In addition, these standards are required knowledge for licensed psychologists and are included on the Examination for Professional Practice in Psychology (EPPP) (see Domain 8, KN62). Although the standards are not a statement of legal requirements, courts have recognized them as an authoritative source for expert opinion on testing practices, and judges tend to be skeptical of expert opinions that seriously conflict with the standards.

The current edition of The Standards for Educational and Psychological Testing was released in July 2014. Five areas received particular attention in the 2014 revision:

1. Examining accountability issues associated with the uses of tests in educational policy
2. Broadening the concept of accessibility of tests for all examinees
3. Representing more comprehensively the role of tests in the workplace
4. Taking into account the expanding role of technology in testing
5. Improving the structure of the book for better communication of the standards

The Standards is written for the professional and for the educated layperson and addresses professional and technical issues of test development and use in education, psychology and employment.

== Previous editions ==
The 2014 edition is the 7th edition of The Standards, and it shares the exact same name as the 1985 and 1999 editions. Technical Recommendations for Psychological Tests and Diagnostic Techniques: A Preliminary Proposal (1952) and Technical Recommendations for Psychological Tests and Diagnostic Techniques (1954) editions were quite brief. The 1966 edition, Standards for Educational and Psychological Tests and Manuals totaled just 40 pages. However, the 1985 edition, the first with the current name, more than doubled in size, and the 1999 edition nearly doubled again.

Since the 1999 edition, The Standards has had more in-depth background material in each chapter, a greater number of standards, and a significantly expanded glossary and index. The 1999 version of The Standards reflects changes in United States federal law and measurement trends affecting validity; testing individuals with disabilities or different linguistic backgrounds; and new types of tests as well as new uses of existing tests. One of the major changes in the 2014 edition was raising the prominence of fairness within The Standards.

== The 8th edition (2025/2026) ==
In 2024, the sponsoring organizations (AERA, NCME, and APA) announced that they would be updating the guidelines once again, and The Standards would again be available both in printed and freely downloadable formats.

The 2025 edition's management committee is made up of one representative from each of the sponsoring organizations: Michael Rodriguez (AERA), Fred Oswald (APA), and Kristen Huff (NCME). Ye Tong, a Senior Vice President at the National Board of Medical Examiners and University of Maryland Professor of Psychology Andres De Los Reyes were selected as the co-chairs of the committee in February, 2024.

The entire joint committee membership has 16 members.

- Ye Tong, PhD, Co-Chair, NBME
- Andres De Los Reyes, PhD, Co-Chair, University of Maryland
- Chad Buckendahl, PhD, ACS Ventures
- Ellen Forte, PhD, edCount
- Laura Hamilton, PhD, American Institutes for Research
- Qiwei He, PhD, Georgetown University
- Nathan Kuncel, PhD, University of Minnesota
- Cara Laitusis, PhD, Center for Assessment
- Maria Marquine, PhD, Duke University
- Rochelle Michel, PhD, Smarter Balanced
- Michael Russell, PhD, Boston College
- Pohai Schultz, PhD, University of Hawai’i
- Steve Sireci, PhD, University of Massachusetts
- Steve Stark, PhD, University of South Florida
- Mark Wilson, PhD, University of California, Berkeley
- Frank Worrell, PhD, University of California, Berkeley

The management committee has already indicated an interest in updating The Standards more frequently. It also has announced that it hopes to provide greater transparency about disagreement among committee members. That is, to be more clear about when there is a strong consensus and when there is disagreement among experts about best practices.

== Organization of the 7th edition (2014) ==
=== Part I: Foundations ===
1. Validity
2. Reliability/Precision and Errors of Measurement
3. Fairness in Testing

=== Part II: Operations ===
4. Test Design and Development
5. Scores, Scales, Norms, Score Linking, and Cut Scores
6. Test Administration, Scoring, Reporting, and Interpretation
7. Supporting Documentation for Tests
8. The Rights and Responsibilities of Test Takers
9. The Rights and Responsibilities of Test Users

=== Part III: Testing Applications ===
10. Psychological Testing and Assessment
11. Workplace Testing and Credentialing
12. Educational Testing and Assessment
13. Uses of Tests for Program Evaluation, Policy Studies, and Accountability

== Organization of the 6th edition (1999) ==
=== Part I: Test Construction, Evaluation, and Documentation ===
1. Validity
2. Reliability and Errors of Measurement
3. Test Development and Revision
4. Scales, Norms, and Score Comparability
5. Test Administration, Scoring, and Reporting
6. Supporting Documentation for Tests

=== Part II: Fairness in Testing ===
7. Fairness in Testing and Test Use
8. The Rights and Responsibilities of Test Takers
9. Testing Individuals of Diverse Linguistic Backgrounds
10. Testing Individuals with Disabilities

=== Part III: Testing Applications ===
11. The Responsibilities of Test Users
12. Psychological Testing and Assessment
13. Educational Testing and Assessment
14. Testing in Employment and Credentialing
15. Testing in Program Evaluation and Public Policy

== Related standards ==
In 1974, the Joint Committee on Standards for Educational Evaluation was charged with the responsibility of writing a companion volume to the 1974 revision of the Standards for Educational and Psychological Tests. This companion volume was to deal with issues and standards for program and curriculum evaluation in education. In 1975, the Joint Committee began work and ultimately decided to establish three separate sets of standards. These standards include The Personnel Evaluation Standards, The Program Evaluation Standards, and The Student Evaluation Standards.

== See also ==
- Standard-setting study
