= Senior School Certificate Examination =

Senior School Certificate Examination may refer to:

- All India Senior School Certificate Examination
- West African Senior School Certificate Examination
