= Board examination =

End-of-year examinations conducted in India

In India, board examinations refer to the public exit standardised examinations conducted at the completion of secondary (Class 10) and senior secondary education (Class 12).

The Class 10 board examinations are conducted by the respective state boards (SSC/SSLC), the Central Board of Secondary Education (All India Secondary School Examination), and the Council for the Indian School Certificate Examinations (ICSE). These examinations are considered important for progression to senior secondary education. After completing the Class 10 board examinations, students are required to choose a stream of study—such as science, commerce, or arts (humanities)—for senior secondary education.

Admit cards for regular candidates in the CBSE examinations are issued by their respective schools, which also inform students about the distribution of the cards. For private candidates, admit cards can be downloaded from the official CBSE website. The board usually releases admit cards for private candidates in early February.

The Class 12 board examinations are conducted by the respective state boards (HSC), the Central Board of Secondary Education (AISSCE), and the Council for the Indian School Certificate Examinations (ISC). Performance in the Class 12 board examinations is considered important for admission to professional courses, training programmes, and institutions of national importance such as AIIMS, NIT, IIT, IIIT, and IIM, through competitive examinations including JEE, NEET, CLAT, CUET, and other entrance tests conducted by universities and colleges in India.

Under the National Education Policy 2020, board examinations are planned to be conducted twice a year, although this has not yet been fully implemented by the government. A 'multiple board' format was introduced on an experimental basis during the 2021–22 academic year for CBSE Classes 10 and 12. The CBSE has announced the implementation of the dual board examination system from the academic year 2025–26.

== State Board Examinations ==
State board examinations, variously referred to as Madhyamik, Secondary School Certificate (SSC), and Higher Secondary Certificate (HSC) examinations, are conducted and managed by the education boards of different states in India. These examinations do not take place simultaneously across states due to differences in syllabi and examination schedules. They are generally held in February and March, with results usually declared in April or May.

Students are required to apply for the examinations in November, providing personal details, subjects, and educational status. The examination timetable is released 40–60 days before the start of the examinations. Admit cards for regular candidates are distributed through schools or notified centres about 20–25 days before the commencement of the examination.

At the Class 10 level, students typically appear for five core subjects: English, Hindi or another regional language, Mathematics, Science, and Social Studies. In state board examinations, the state language is usually compulsory. Students may also opt for an additional sixth subject, such as Computer Science, Information Technology, Music, Fine Arts, Physical Education, or a foreign language.

At the Class 12 level, students choose one of three streams—Science, Commerce, or Humanities.

- Science stream focuses on natural sciences and mathematics. Core subjects include English, Physics, and Chemistry, along with either Biology or Mathematics (or both). Schools may also offer vocational subjects such as Computer science, Information Technology, Artificial Intelligence, Food Nutrition and Dietetics, Biotechnology, and Web Application.
- Commerce stream is oriented towards business, management, administration, trade, and banking. Core subjects include English, Accountancy, Economics, and Business Studies. Vocational subjects offered by schools may include Marketing, Retail, Taxation, Banking, Entrepreneurship, Mathematics, and Computer Science.
- Humanities stream covers social sciences and liberal arts. Core subjects generally include English, History, Geography, Political Science, and Economics (any two or more depending on school policy). Vocational subjects may include Mass Media, Fashion Studies, Legal Studies, Psychology, Tourism, Beauty and Wellness, Home Science, Food Nutrition and Dietetics, Fine Arts, Sociology, and Philosophy.

In addition, Hindi may be offered either as a compulsory or optional subject, depending on the school. Certain subjects such as Business Administration, Economics, Music, Fine Arts, Physical Education, National Cadets Corps, Geography, Computer Science, Information Technology, Artificial Intelligence, and Foreign languages may be offered across all three streams.

Examinations are handwritten, and are conducted simultaneously across each state to prevent question paper leaks. Security at examination centres is usually high. The examinations typically begin in February and conclude in March or April. Exams usually start at 10:30 a.m. IST and last for two to three hours. Question papers are distributed by the state boards and are closely guarded until the start of the exam. Multiple sets of question papers may be used.

Admit cards (also known as hall tickets or exam passes) are generally issued 14–15 days before the examination. Private candidates are required to download their admit cards from the official website of the respective board. For the academic year 2024–25, CBSE released admit cards on 3 February 2025. Admit cards must be presented at the examination centre for verification, and candidates are checked for barred items. To ensure impartiality, examination centres are usually different from the student’s own school, and candidates must not reveal their identity on answer sheets except through the identity-masking roll number provided. Use of calculation aids other than logarithm tables, which are supplied by the examination centre, is prohibited.

In May 2017, the Delhi High Court directed CBSE to follow the moderation policy, which delayed the announcement of results that year.

Answer sheets are returned to the respective boards for evaluation. The CBSE has 18 regional offices across India that coordinate evaluation and revaluation processes. Answer sheets are anonymised using a false roll number before being sent for evaluation, which is conducted on the basis of pre-set marking schemes and example answers. Identity numbers are later matched to the actual roll numbers of candidates to prevent examiner bias. Foreign answer sheets are sent to the Delhi East regional office. The Government of India has also proposed establishing a regional office in Dubai, United Arab Emirates to cater to the needs of non-resident Indians (NRIs).

After evaluation, the boards issue official mark sheets and certificates of completion. While students usually only receive their final results, they can apply to obtain copies of their evaluated answer sheets or request revaluation upon payment of a fee.

Results are declared both online and offline, although heavy traffic on result days often causes websites to slow down or crash.

The CBSE Class 10 (AISSE) and Class 12 (AISSCE) results for the 2023–24 batch were declared on 13 May 2024. For the academic year 2024–25, the results were announced on 13 May 2025.

== See also ==
- Central board of secondary education
- All India Secondary School Examination
- All India Senior Secondary School Examination
- Secondary School Certificate
- Higher Secondary School Certificate
- State Board Of School Examinations (Sec.) & Board Of Higher Secondary Examinations, Tamil Nadu (SBSEBHSE)
- CISCE
- ICSE
- ISC
