= Teaching to the test =

Idiom for extrinsically-motivated education

"Teaching to the test" refers to an educational strategy where curriculum and teachers' instruction are heavily focused on preparing students for standardized tests. This approach aligns teaching content and efforts directly with better familiarization of the test format and questions, aiming to improve student performance on test scores and academic gradings, which are treated as quantified key performance indicators.

== Teaching methods ==
Common methods of teaching to the test include:

- Test-focused instruction: Specific test-related content is taught, followed by assessments that mirror the standardized test format. This typically involves testing factual recall or step-by-step procedures rather than fostering deeper understanding.
- Skill-based learning: In areas like typing, athletics, or other practical skills, teaching to the test is the primary approach, emphasizing practice and repetition to achieve proficiency.

However, teaching to the test can sometimes misrepresent students' actual learning. For example, students who memorize vocabulary for a reading test may perform well on that specific assessment but struggle to apply the vocabulary in broader contexts. In mathematics, students familiar with test-like questions might fail to apply the same concepts to differently phrased problems. Research by Craig Jerald showed that drilling on specific test items may lead to improved performance on those items but may not translate to broader skill mastery.

== Impact on educational practice ==
The implementation of the No Child Left Behind act in the United States increased the focus on standardized testing, leading to widespread adoption of teaching to the test. This is particularly prominent in schools that depend on government funding, where test scores are a critical measure of success.

Some critics assert that a focus on test preparation undermines comprehensive education, as time is diverted from exploring moral, aesthetic, or creative aspects of learning. Concerns have been raised that standardized testing is not a fair measure of all students' abilities, as test-taking skills, test anxiety, or language barriers can influence performance.

== Validity of standardized testing ==
The practice of teaching to the test may reduce the validity of standardized test results, as scores can be inflated due to overemphasis on test-related content rather than overall subject mastery. Gabe Pressman, a journalist for WNBC-TV, noted that political pressures could lead to adjusting test benchmarks to achieve desired outcomes, potentially distorting true student achievement levels. Additionally, W. James Popham, an emeritus professor of education, argued that standardized tests might not accommodate students from different backgrounds, particularly new immigrants with varied educational experiences.

== Ethical perspectives ==
A 1989 study on the ethical implications of teaching to the test identified a range of practices, from broad-based instruction on general objectives to direct use of test items in teaching. The study concluded that ethical boundaries lie between general instruction and the use of specific test formats or questions, suggesting that practices such as teaching directly from released test items are less ethical.

== Examples of teaching to the test ==
- Test preparation courses: Specialized programs focused on improving performance on standardized tests, often involving intensive practice on test-like questions.
- Cram schools: Institutions designed to prepare students for specific examinations through concentrated study and test-taking practice.

== Criticism and debate ==
Critics of teaching to the test argue that it narrows the curriculum, emphasizing only those skills and knowledge required for standardized tests. This may limit opportunities for students to develop a holistic understanding of subjects, often reducing learning to rote memorization and repetition of isolated skills, a practice sometimes termed "drill and kill." Such strategies are said to restrict creative, critical, and abstract thinking and could diminish teachers' ability to engage students with a broader and more meaningful curriculum. Some research also suggests that these methods may not effectively improve test scores as intended.

Teaching to the test is also associated with Campbell's law, which suggests that when undue importance is placed on a particular performance indicator (such as test scores), it can lead to distortion of the educational process it is supposed to measure.

== See also ==
- Washback effect, the general phenomenon which gives rise to teaching to the test
- Overfitting, a similar problem in statistics and optimization problems
- Educational aims and objectives
- Volvo effect
- Metric fixation
