= All India Secondary School Examination =

Indian secondary school completion standardized examination

- Acronym: AISSE, SSE
- Type: Pen-Paper-based standardized test
- Administrator: Central Board of Secondary Education
- Skills tested: Languages, Mathematics, Science, Social Science, Skill-based subjects
- Purpose: Secondary School Completion (Class 10)
- Duration: 3 hours per subject (Normal Subjects) 2 hours per subject (Vocational Subjects and Skill based subject)
- Score range: 0-500
- Offered: Yearly, between February and April (Note: Practical Exams are usually conducted between December and February)
- Restrictions on attempts: Once. In case of failure, supplementary or compartment exams are usually allowed.
- Regions: India; Foreign: Afghanistan; Bahrain; Bangladesh; Egypt; Ethiopia; Ghana; Indonesia; Iran; Iraq; Japan; Kenya; Kuwait; Liberia; Libya; Malaysia; Myanmar; Nepal; Nigeria; Oman; Qatar; Republic of Benin; Russia; Saudi Arabia; Singapore; Tanzania; Thailand; Uganda; United Arab Emirates; Yemen; (Most of the examinations are conducted by the CBSE with the assistance of the Ministry of External Affairs, the Ministry of Education of India, and the respective countries.)
- Languages: Papers are offered either in Hindi or in English (based on the school being an english-medium school or a hindi-medium school)
- Annual number of test takers: ▲ Registered Students(2025): 23,85,079 Appeared Students(2025): 23,71,939
- Prerequisites: Intended for Class 10 students in CBSE-affiliated institutions
- Fee: Usually paid by students, based on the subjects taken through the form given by CBSE
- Used by: Senior Secondary Schools (for Class 11 admission) and higher education institutes
- Qualification rate: 93.66%(2025)
- Website: www.cbse.gov.in

All India Secondary School Examination (AISSE), also known as Secondary School Examination (SSE) or the Class 10th Board Exam, is a final centralized public examination that is conducted for the students in Secondary Schools affiliated with the Central Board of Secondary Education, primarily in India but also in other Indian-patterned schools affiliated to the CBSE across the world, taken at the end of Class 10. It is the equivalent of GCSE examinations taken in the United Kingdom.

The board conducts the examination during the period of February–March. Previously, it was held between March and April each year. In this exam, Mathematics, Science (Physics, Chemistry, and Biology combined), and Social Science (History, Geography, Political Science, and Economics combined) are compulsory. Students must also take any two languages, which include the official language of instruction and a foreign or scheduled language. Additionally, students may choose optional skill subjects such as Information Technology, Painting, Artificial Intelligence, and various other subjects.

Successful candidates are awarded the Secondary School Completion Certificate along with a statement of marks. Currently, they also receive a Migration Certificate and a Marks Statement cum Certificate, confirming that the candidate has completed secondary schooling and is eligible to pursue higher education. For the academic year 2016–17, the Central Board of Secondary Education (CBSE) reinstated the previous syllabus and marking scheme, with the complete syllabus assessed for the All India Secondary School Examination and marks out of 500. In India, there are state-level examinations conducted by various State Examination Boards, as well as central examinations such as CBSE and CISCE.

== The examination and effects of Continuous and Comprehensive Evaluation ==
The examinations, commonly referred to as board exams, are conducted with great enthusiasm in India. Earlier, students were evaluated under a system called Continuous and Comprehensive Evaluation (CCE). This method was introduced by the then Union HRD Minister, Kapil Sibal, with the aim of reducing academic stress among students.

Under this system, the academic year was divided into two semesters. Each semester comprised two formative tests and one summative test. Previously, examinations were conducted only at the end of the year, but the semester pattern split them into two halves: the first from April to September and the second from October to March.

However, beginning with the 2017–18 academic year, the CCE scheme was replaced with the traditional system of evaluation.

== Exam components ==
Each subject is marked out of a total of 80 (theoretical/written) and 20 marks for practical assessment techniques such as assignments, classroom projects, and presentations. According to the new pattern, each subject is marked out of a total of 80 (theoretical), and the remaining 20 marks (internal assessment) are divided into 5 for the practical assessment, 5 for notebook submission and 10 for practice tests conducted autonomously by schools affiliated to the Central Board of Secondary Education.

From the academic year 2019–20, the Central Board of Secondary Education changed this pattern where 80 marks for theory are the same but increased the number of questions and provide more internal choices in the paper. Also, to tackle rote learning in schools, they decreased the weight of Tests from 10 to 5 and increased the marks of assignment to 15 (Multiple assessments and Portfolio)

Each candidate gives either five or six exams, each of 100 marks and the best five subjects are taken into the consideration. English and regional language are compulsory to be included. They are marked out of 500 marks and then the percentage is taken out.

Students are required to get a minimum score of 33 out of 100 (In most of the Boards) in every subject to successfully pass the examination.

The Central Board of Secondary Education (CBSE) has implemented significant changes to its examination pattern in alignment with the National Education Policy (NEP) 2020, starting from the academic year, 2022–23.

These modifications aim to strengthen the assessment system by incorporating competency-based questions that evaluate students’ ability to apply knowledge in real-life contexts. Presently, around 40% of questions in Class 10 board examinations are competency-based, testing students’ capacity to apply concepts in unfamiliar or practical scenarios. These competency-based questions take various forms, including multiple-choice questions (MCQs), case-based questions, source-based integrated questions, and assertion-reasoning type questions. Alongside these, the examination papers continue to feature objective-type questions (20%) and constructed response questions (short and long answer types, 50%), ensuring a balanced assessment of both factual knowledge and application skills.

These changes were implemented to move away from rote learning and encourage higher-order thinking skills among students. The introduction of competency-based questions aimed to foster critical thinking, problem-solving abilities, and the application of knowledge in practical contexts. This shift was in line with the NEP 2020's emphasis on transforming assessment practices to optimize learning and development.

== Post-Examination ==
In India, schools and junior colleges often consider All India Secondary School Examination scores for admission to higher secondary disciplines (humanities, sciences, commerce or vocational courses) in the absence of admission tests. Thus, the exams turn to be the deciding factor in deciding in which stream will the student be comfortable.

== SSC ==
Some states in India (e.g., Andhra Pradesh, Gujarat, Goa, Madhya Pradesh, Maharashtra, Tamil Nadu, Telangana, West Bengal, Karnataka, and Kerala) conduct their own secondary school examinations according to the pattern of the respective state boards. These exams are known as the Secondary School Certificate (SSC) Examination, also referred to as the Secondary School Leaving Certificate (SSLC) Examination, or the Matriculation Examination.

At the end of the academic year, board examinations are conducted by both national and state boards. These include:

- CBSE: All India Secondary School Examination (AISSE)
- CISCE: Indian Certificate of Secondary Education (ICSE)
- State Boards: Secondary School Certificate (SSC), Secondary School Leaving Certificate (SSLC), and Matriculation Examinations for Class 10.

All of these examinations serve the same purpose: certifying the completion of secondary education.

== Scheme of evaluation in other national boards ==
Central Board of Secondary Education and other central boards such as Council for the Indian School Certificate Examinations and National Institute of Open Schooling have schools which follow their scheme of education all over the country.

== See also ==
- All India Senior School Certificate Examination
- Junior Science Talent Search Examination
