= Volvo effect =

Term for a critique of standardized testing

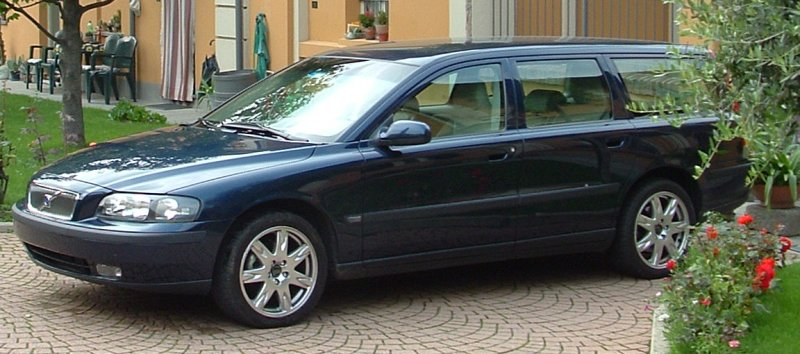
Academic achievement, as measured by standardized tests, is correlated with the students' parents being able to buy luxury vehicles, such as this Volvo.

The Volvo effect is a critique of standardized testing in U.S. schools, especially the SAT, that says students from high-income families do better than students from low-income families. The name was coined by Peter Sacks in his 2001 book Standardized Minds. In this, he proposes that schools could estimate student performance on certain styles of standardized tests simply by counting the number of Volvos or comparably expensive cars owned by a student's family.

It has been facetiously proposed as an alternative method for measuring school quality and student achievement, particularly when the goal is a norm-referenced ranking (in which some test takers must be judged as doing better than the rest) instead of a criterion-referenced test (which measures whether the test taker knows or can do a pre-specified thing, even if this means that all test takers have the same score).

The original text in which the Volvo effect was advanced said:

Although standardized tests have a relatively bleak record of predicting success in school and work, we know that they do tend to correlate exceedingly well with the income and education of one's parents. Call it the "Volvo Effect." The data is so strong in this regard that one could make a good guess about a child's standardized test scores by simply looking at how many degrees her parents have and what kind of car they drive.

Sacks criticized the SAT in particular, for showing a demonstrable difference in the scores achieved by high-income and low-income students. At the time, a typical low-income American student with a family income of $20,000 per year (about $37,000 now) would score about 100 to 350 points less (Note: The score range for the SAT in 2000 was 350 to 1600 points, with a typical total score of about 1000 – or, by inference, about 900 for a low-income student and about 1100 for a high-income student.) than a typical high-income student with a family income of $90,000 per year (about $168,000 now).
