= Standardized test =

Test administered and scored in a predetermined, standard manner

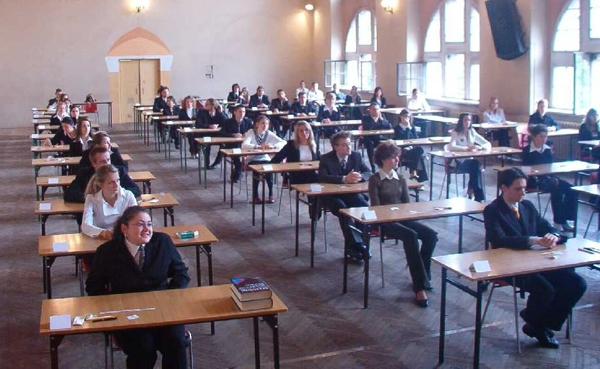
Young adults in Poland sit for their Matura exams. The Matura is standardized so that universities can easily compare results from students across the entire country.

A standardized test is a test that is administered and scored in a consistent or standard manner. Standardized tests are designed in such a way that the questions and interpretations are consistent and are administered and scored in a predetermined, standard manner.

A standardized test is administered and scored uniformly for all test takers. Any test in which the same test is given in the same manner to all test takers, and graded in the same manner for everyone, is a standardized test. Standardized tests do not need to be high-stakes tests, time-limited tests, multiple-choice tests, academic tests, or tests given to large numbers of test takers. Standardized tests can take various forms, including written, oral, or practical test. The standardized test may evaluate many subjects, including driving, creativity, athleticism, personality, professional ethics, as well as academic skills.

The opposite of standardized testing is non-standardized testing, in which either significantly different tests are given to different test takers, or the same test is assigned under significantly different conditions or evaluated differently.

Most everyday quizzes and tests taken by students during school meet the definition of a standardized test: everyone in the class takes the same test, at the same time, under the same circumstances, and all of the tests are graded by their teacher in the same way. However, the term standardized test is most commonly used to refer to tests that are given to larger groups, such as a test taken by all adults who wish to acquire a license to get a particular job, or by all students of a certain age. Most standardized tests are summative assessments (assessments that measure the learning of the participants at the end of an instructional unit).

Because everyone gets the same test and the same grading system, standardized tests are often perceived as being fairer than non-standardized tests. Such tests are often thought of as more objective than a system in which some test takers get an easier test and others get a more difficult test. Standardized tests are designed to permit reliable comparison of outcomes across all test takers because everyone is taking the same test and being graded the same way.

== Definition ==
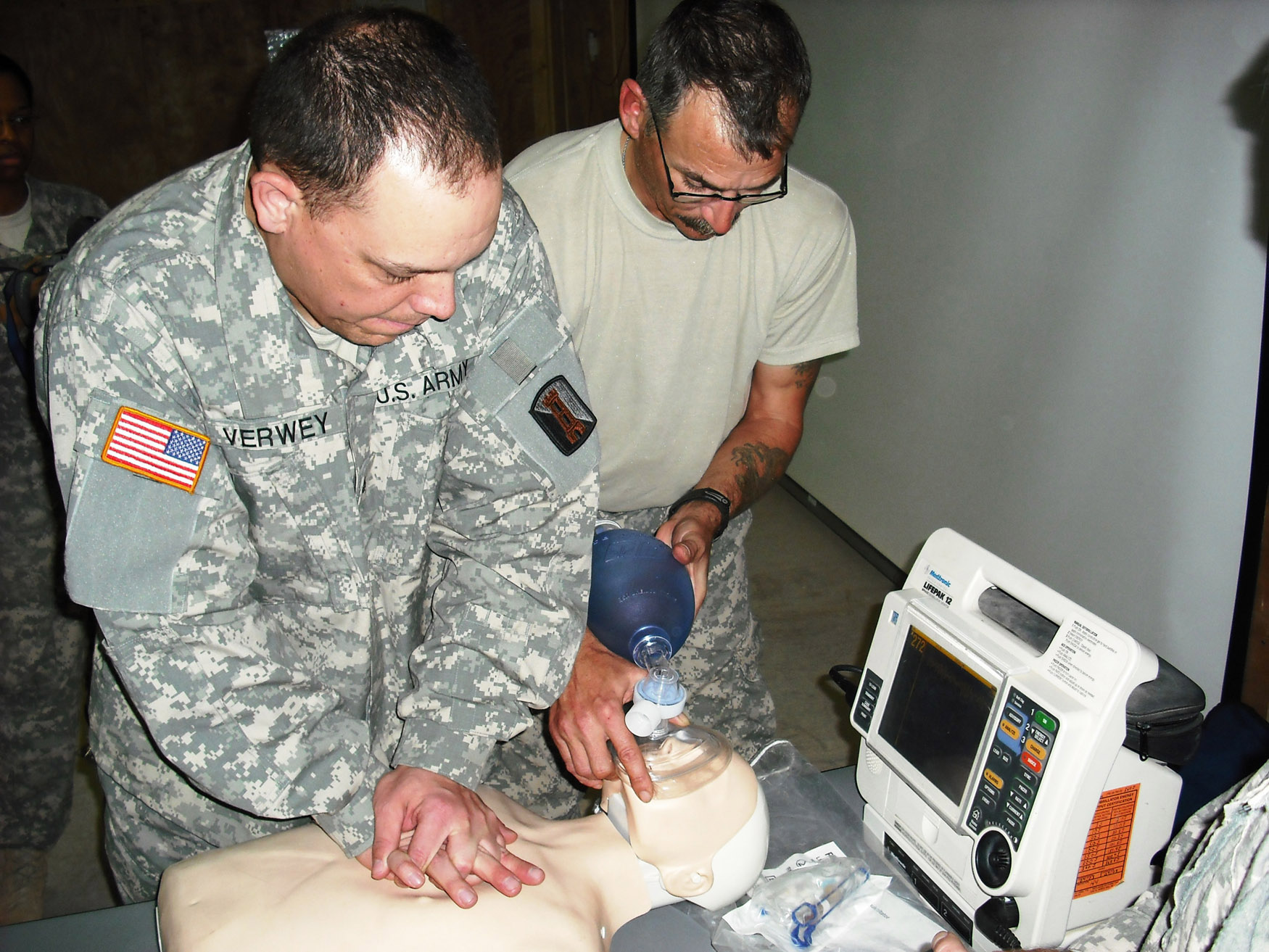
Two men take an authentic, non-written, criterion-referenced standardized test. If they perform cardiopulmonary resuscitation on the mannequin with the correct speed and pressure, they will pass this exam.

The definition of a standardized test has changed somewhat over time. In 1960, standardized tests were defined as those in which the conditions and content were equal for everyone taking the test, regardless of when, where, or by whom the test was given or graded. Standardized tests have a consistent, uniform method for scoring. This means that all test takers who answer a test question in the same way will get the same score for that question. The purpose of this standardization is to make sure that the scores reliably indicate the abilities or skills being measured, and not other variables.

By the beginning of the 21st century, the focus shifted away from a strict sameness of conditions towards equal fairness of testing conditions. For example, a test taker with a broken wrist might write more slowly because of the injury, and it would be more equitable, and produce a more reliable understanding of the test taker's actual knowledge, if that person were given a few more minutes to write down the answers to a time-limited test. Changing the testing conditions in a way that improves fairness with respect to a permanent or temporary disability, but without undermining the main point of the assessment, is called an accommodation. However, if the accommodation undermines the purpose of the test, then the allowances would become a modification of the content, and no longer a standardized test.

Examples of standardized and non-standardized tests
Subject	Format	Standardized test	Non-standardized test
History	Oral	Each student is given the same questions, and their answers are scored in the same way.	The teacher asks each student a different question. Some questions are harder than others.
Driving	Practical skills	Each driving student is asked to do the same things, and they are all evaluated by the same standards.	Some driving students have to drive on a highway, but others only have to drive slowly around the block. One examiner takes points off for "bad attitude", but other examiners do not.
Mathematics	Written	Each student is given the same questions, and their answers are scored in the same way.	The teacher gives different questions to different students: an easy test for poor students, another test for most students, and a difficult test for the best students.
Music	Audition	All musicians play the same piece of music. The judges agreed in advance how much factors such as timing, expression, and musicality count for.	Each musician chooses a different piece of music to play. Judges choose the musician they like best. One judge gives extra points to musicians who wear a costume.

== History ==
=== China ===
The earliest evidence of standardized testing was in China, during the Han dynasty, where the imperial examinations covered the Six Arts which included music, archery, horsemanship, arithmetic, writing, and knowledge of the rituals and ceremonies of both public and private parts. These exams were used to select employees for the state bureaucracy.

Later, sections on military strategies, civil law, revenue and taxation, agriculture and geography were added to the testing. In this form, the examinations were institutionalized for more than a millennium.

Today, standardized testing remains widely used, most notably in the Gaokao system.

=== UK ===
Standardized testing was introduced into Europe in the early 19th century, modeled on the Chinese mandarin examinations, through the advocacy of British colonial administrators, the most "persistent" of which was Britain's consul in Guangzhou, China, Thomas Taylor Meadows. Meadows warned of the collapse of the British Empire if standardized testing was not implemented throughout the empire immediately.

Prior to their adoption, standardized testing was not traditionally a part of Western pedagogy. Based on the skeptical and open-ended tradition of debate inherited from Ancient Greece, Western academia favored non-standardized assessments using essays written by students. Because of this, the first European implementation of standardized testing did not occur in Europe proper, but in British India. Inspired by the Chinese use of standardized testing, in the early 19th century, British company managers used standardized exams for hiring and promotions to keep the process fair and free from corruption or favoritism. This practice of standardized testing was later adopted in the late 19th century in the Britain mainland. The parliamentary debates that ensued made many references to the "Chinese mandarin system".

Standardized testing spread from Britain not only throughout the British Commonwealth, but to Europe and then America. Its spread was fueled by the Industrial Revolution, where the increase in number of school students as a result of compulsory education laws decreased the use of open-ended assessments, which were harder to mass-produce and assess objectively.

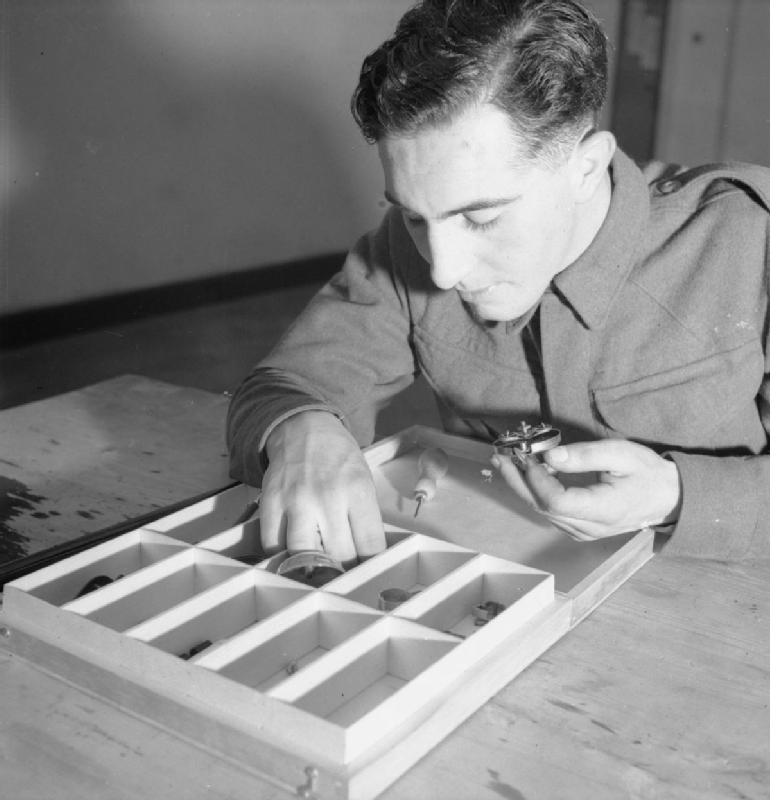
British soldiers took standardized tests during the Second World War. This new recruit is sorting mechanical parts to test his understanding of machinery. His uniform shows no name, rank, or other sign that might bias the scoring of his work.

Standardized tests such as the War Office Selection Boards were developed for the British Army during World War II to choose candidates for officer training and other tasks. The tests looked at soldiers' mental abilities, mechanical skills, ability to work with others, and other qualities. Previous methods had suffered from bias and resulted in choosing the wrong soldiers for officer training.

=== United States ===
Standardized testing has been a part of United States education since the 19th century, but the widespread reliance on standardized testing in schools in the US is largely a 20th-century phenomenon.

Immigration in the mid-19th century contributed to the growth of standardized tests in the United States. Standardized tests were used when people first entered the US to test social roles and find social power and status.

The College Entrance Examination Board began offering standardized testing for university and college admission in 1901, covering nine subjects. This test was implemented with the idea of creating standardized admissions for the United States in northeastern elite universities. Originally, the test was also meant for top boarding schools, in order to align the curriculum between schools. Originally the standardized test was made of essays and was not intended for widespread testing.

During World War I, the Army Alpha and Beta tests were developed to help place new recruits in appropriate assignments based upon their assessed intelligence levels. The first edition of a modern standardized test for IQ, the Stanford–Binet Intelligence Test, appeared in 1916. The College Board then designed the SAT (Scholar Aptitude Test) in 1926. The first SAT test was based on the Army IQ tests, with the goal of determining the test taker's intelligence, problem-solving skills, and critical thinking. In 1959, Everett Lindquist offered the ACT (American College Testing) for the first time. As of 2020, the ACT includes four main sections with multiple-choice questions to test English, mathematics, reading, and science, plus an optional writing section.

Individual states began testing large numbers of children and teenagers through the public school systems in the 1970s. By the 1980s, American schools were assessing nationally. In 2012, 45 states paid an average of $27 per student, and $669 million overall, on large-scale annual academic tests. However, indirect costs, such as paying teachers to prepare students for the tests and for class time spent administering the tests, significantly exceed the direct cost of the test itself.

The need for the federal government to make meaningful comparisons across a highly de-centralized (locally controlled) public education system encouraged the use of large-scale standardized testing. The Elementary and Secondary Education Act of 1965 required some standardized testing in public schools. The No Child Left Behind Act of 2001 further tied some types of public school funding to the results of standardized testing. Under these federal laws, the school curriculum was still set by each state, but the federal government required states to assess how well schools and teachers were teaching the state-chosen material with standardized tests. The results of large-scale standardized tests were used to allocate funds and other resources to schools, and to close poorly performing schools. The Every Student Succeeds Act replaced the NCLB at the end of 2015. By that point, these large-scale standardized tests had become controversial in the United States not necessarily because all the students were taking the same tests and being scored the same way, but because they had become high-stakes tests for the school systems and teachers.

In recent years, many US universities and colleges have abandoned the requirement of standardized test scores by applicants.

=== Australia ===
The Australian National Assessment Program – Literacy and Numeracy (NAPLAN) standardized testing was commenced in 2008 by the Australian Curriculum, Assessment and Reporting Authority, an independent authority "responsible for the development of a national curriculum, a national assessment program and a national data collection and reporting program that supports 21st century learning for all Australian students".

The testing includes all students in Years 3, 5, 7 and 9 in Australian schools to be assessed using national tests. The subjects covered in these tests include Reading, Writing, Language Conventions (Spelling, Grammar and Punctuation) and Numeracy.

The program presents students level reports designed to enable parents to see their child's progress over the course of their schooling life, and help teachers to improve individual learning opportunities for their students. Students and school level data are also provided to the appropriate school system on the understanding that they can be used to target specific supports and resources to schools that need them most. Teachers and schools use this information, in conjunction with other information, to determine how well their students are performing and to identify any areas of need requiring assistance.

The concept of testing student achievement is not new, although the current Australian approach may be said to have its origins in current educational policy structures in both the US and the UK. There are several key differences between the Australian NAPLAN and the UK and USA strategies. Schools that are found to be under-performing in the Australian context will be offered financial assistance under the current federal government policy.

=== Colombia ===
In 1968 the Colombian Institute for the Evaluation of Education (ICFES) was born to regulate higher education. The previous public evaluation system for the authorization of operation and legal recognition for institutions and university programs was implemented.

Colombia has several standardized tests that assess the level of education in the country. These exams are performed by the ICFES.

Students in third grade, fifth grade and ninth grade take the "Saber 3°5°9°" exam. This test is currently presented on a computer in controlled and census samples.

Upon leaving high school students present the "Saber 11" that allows them to enter different universities in the country. Students studying at home can take this exam to graduate from high school and get their degree certificate and diploma.

Students leaving university must take the "Saber Pro" exam.

=== Canada ===
Canada leaves education, and standardized testing as result, under the jurisdiction of the provinces. Each province has its own province-wide standardized testing regime, ranging from no required standardized tests for students in Saskatchewan to exams worth 40% of final high school grades in Newfoundland and Labrador.

== Design and scoring ==
=== Design ===
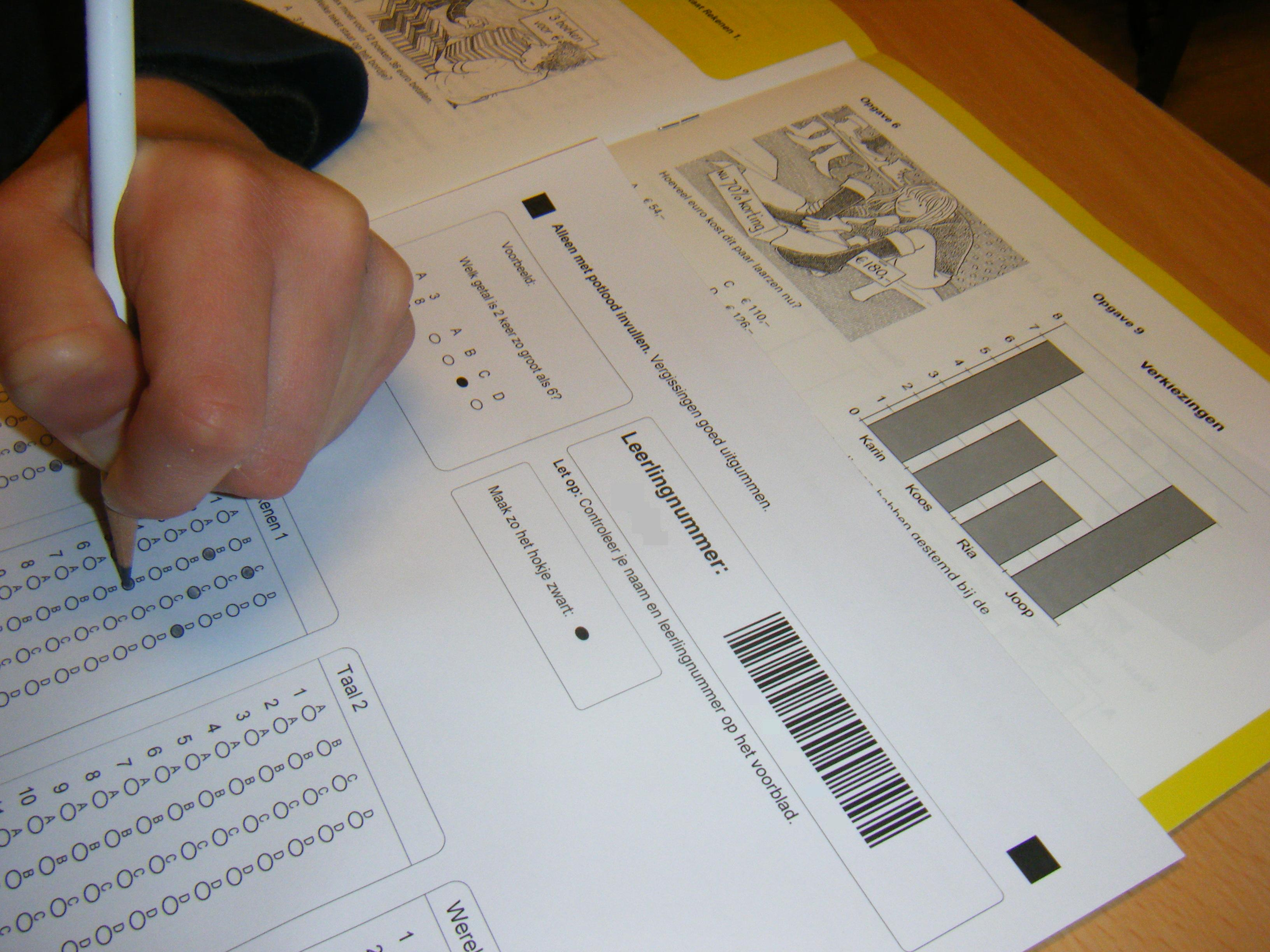
Some standardized testing uses multiple-choice tests, which are relatively inexpensive to score, but any form of assessment can be used.

Most commonly, a major academic test includes both human-scored and computer-scored sections.

A standardized test can be composed of multiple-choice questions, true-false questions, essay questions, authentic assessments, or nearly any other form of assessment. Multiple-choice and true-false items are often chosen for tests that are taken by thousands of people because they can be given and scored inexpensively, quickly, and reliably through using special answer sheets that can be read by a computer or via computer-adaptive testing. Some standardized tests have short-answer or essay writing components that are assigned a score by independent evaluators who use rubrics (rules or guidelines) and benchmark papers (examples of papers for each possible score) to determine the grade to be given to a response.

==== Any subject matter ====
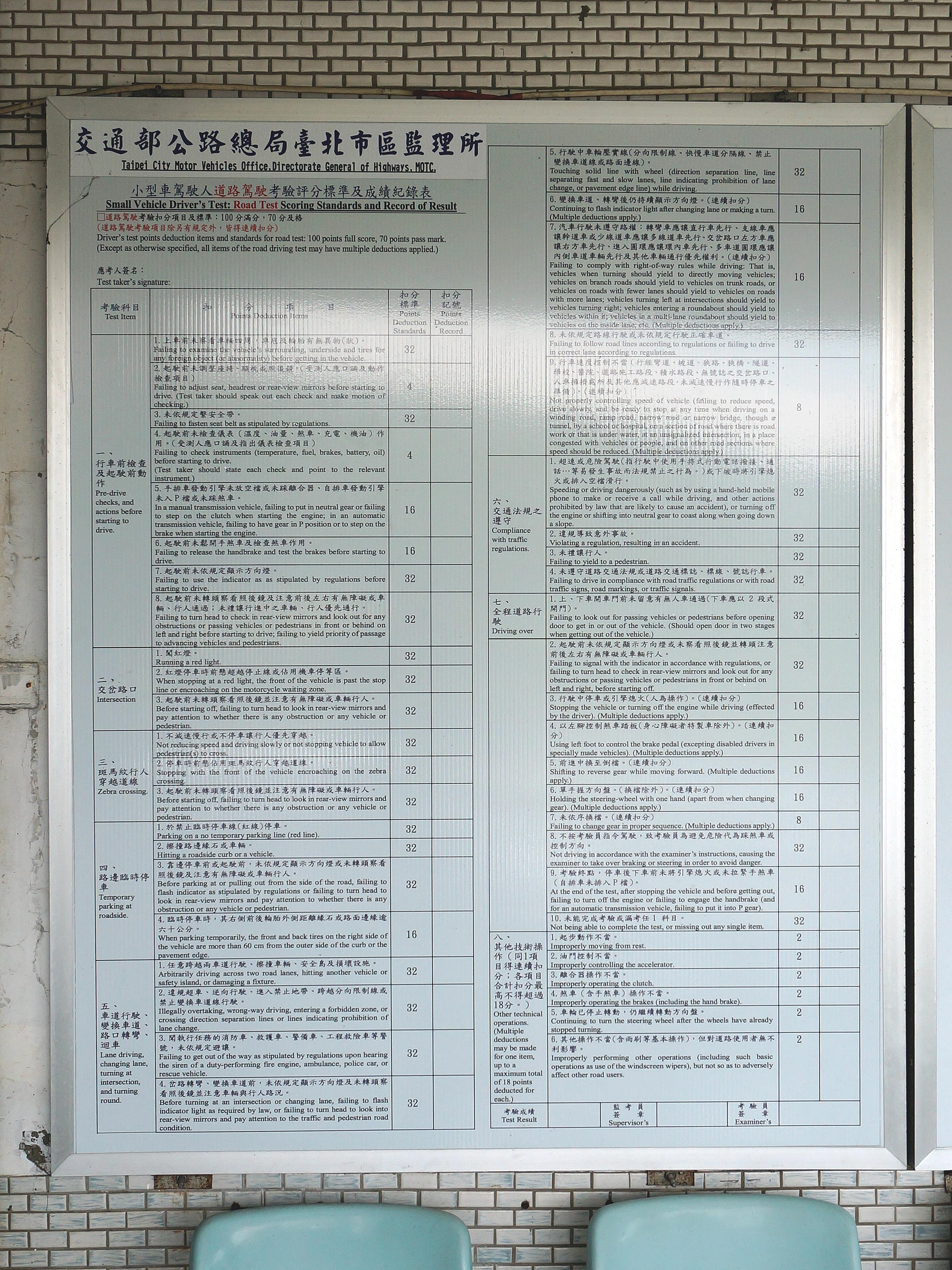
Poster showing the standards for passing driving tests in Taiwan. Every person who wants a driver's license takes the same test and gets scored in the same way.

Not all standardized tests involve answering questions. An authentic assessment for athletic skills could take the form of running for a set amount of time or dribbling a ball for a certain distance. Healthcare professionals must pass tests proving that they can perform medical procedures. Candidates for driver's licenses must pass a standardized test showing that they can drive a car. The Canadian Standardized Test of Fitness has been used in medical research, to determine how physically fit the test takers are.

=== Machine and human scoring ===
Since the latter part of the 20th century, large-scale standardized testing has been shaped in part, by the ease and low cost of grading of multiple-choice tests by computer. Most national and international assessments are not fully evaluated by people.

People are used to score items that are not able to be scored easily by computer (such as essays). For example, the Graduate Record Exam is a computer-adaptive assessment that requires no scoring by people except for the writing portion.

Human scoring is relatively expensive and often variable, which is why computer scoring is preferred when feasible. For example, some critics say that poorly paid employees will score tests badly. Agreement between scorers can vary between 60 and 85 percent, depending on the test and the scoring session. For large-scale tests in schools, some test-givers pay to have two or more scorers read each paper; if their scores do not agree, then the paper is passed to additional scorers.

Though the process is more difficult than grading multiple-choice tests electronically, essays can also be graded by computer. In other instances, essays and other open-ended responses are graded according to a pre-determined assessment rubric by trained graders. For example, at Pearson, all essay graders have four-year university degrees, and a majority are current or former classroom teachers.

=== Use of rubrics for fairness ===
Using a rubric is meant to increase fairness when the test taker's performance is evaluated. In standardized testing, measurement error (a consistent pattern of errors and biases in scoring the test) is easy to determine in standardized testing. When the score depends upon the graders' individual preferences, then test takers' grades depend upon who grades the test.

Standardized tests also remove grader bias in assessment. Research shows that teachers create a kind of self-fulfilling prophecy in their assessment of test takers, granting those they anticipate will achieve with higher scores and giving those who they expect to fail lower grades. In non-standardized assessment, graders have more individual discretion and therefore are more likely to produce unfair results through unconscious bias.

Sample scoring for the open-ended history question: What caused World War II?
Student answers	Standardized grading	Non-standardized grading
	Grading rubric: Answers must be marked correct if they mention at least one of the following: Germany's invasion of Poland, Japan's invasion of China, or economic issues.	No grading standards. Each teacher grades however he or she wants to, considering whatever factors the teacher chooses, such as the answer, the amount of effort, the student's academic background, language ability, or attitude.
Student #1: WWII was caused by Hitler and Germany invading Poland in 1939.	Teacher #1: This answer mentions one of the required items, so it is correct. Teacher #2: This answer is correct.	Teacher #1: I feel like this answer is good enough, so I'll mark it correct. Teacher #2: This answer is correct, but this good student should be able to do better than that, so I'll only give partial credit.
Student #2: WWII was caused by multiple factors, including the Great Depression and the general economic situation, the rise of national socialism, fascism, and imperialist expansionism, and unresolved resentments related to WWI. The war in Europe began with the German invasion of Poland.	Teacher #1: This answer mentions one of the required items, so it is correct. Teacher #2: This answer is correct.	Teacher #1: I feel like this answer is correct and complete, so I'll give full credit. Teacher #2: This answer is correct, so I'll give full points.
Student #3: WWII was caused by the assassination of Archduke Ferdinand in 1914.	Teacher #1: This answer does not mention any of the required items. No points. Teacher #2: This answer is wrong. No credit.	Teacher #1: This answer is wrong. No points. Teacher #2: This answer is wrong, but this student tried hard and the sentence is grammatically correct, so I'll give one point for effort.

=== Using scores for comparisons ===
There are two types of test score interpretations: a norm-referenced score interpretation or a criterion-referenced score interpretation.

- Norm-referenced score interpretations compare test takers to a sample of peers. The goal is to rank test takers as being better or worse than others. Norm-referenced test score interpretations are associated with traditional education. People who perform better than others pass the test, and people who perform worse than others fail the test.
- Criterion-referenced score interpretations compare test takers to a criterion (a formal definition of content), regardless of the scores of other examinees. These may also be described as standards-based assessments, as they are aligned with the standards-based education reform movement. Criterion-referenced score interpretations are concerned solely with whether or not this particular student's answer is correct and complete. Under criterion-referenced systems, it is possible for all test takers to pass the test, or for all test takers to fail the test.

Either of these systems can be used in standardized testing. What is important to standardized testing is whether all students are asked the equivalent questions, under reasonably equal circumstances, and graded according to the same standards.

A norm-referenced test may be designed to find where the test taker falls along a normal curve.

A normative assessment compares each test taker against other test takers. A norm-referenced test (NRT) is a type of test, assessment, or evaluation which yields an estimate of the position of the tested individual in a predefined population. The estimate is derived from the analysis of test scores and other relevant data from a sample drawn from the population. This type of test identifies whether the test taker performed better or worse than other people taking this test. An IQ test is a norm-referenced standardized test.

Comparing against others makes norm-referenced standardized tests useful for admissions purposes in higher education, where a school is trying to compare students from across the nation or across the world. The standardization ensures that all of the students are being tested equally, and the norm-referencing identifies which are better or worse. Examples of such international benchmark tests include the Trends in International Mathematics and Science Study (TIMMS) and the Progress in International Reading Literacy Study (PIRLS).

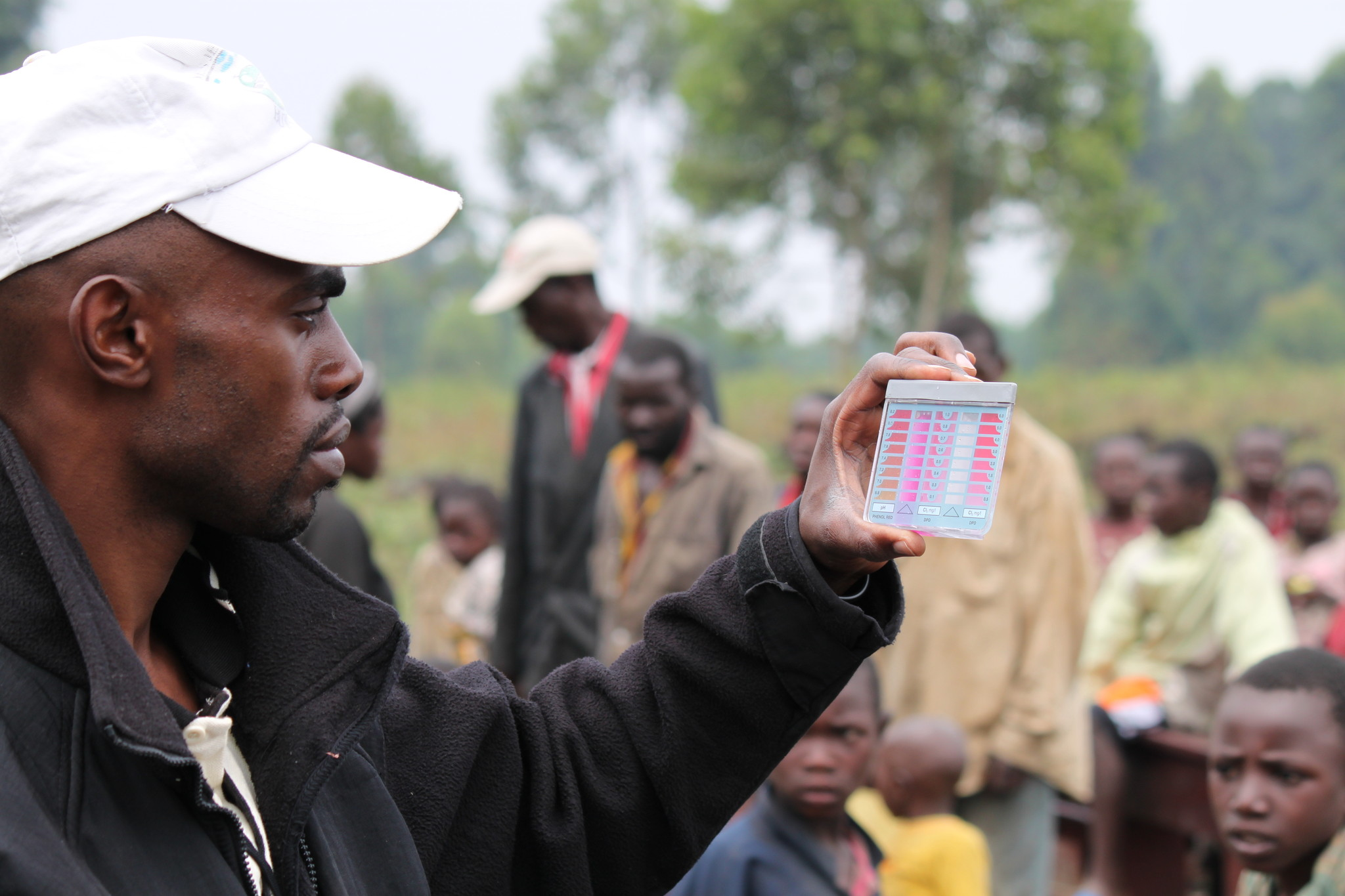
Water testing uses criterion-referenced testing, because it is more important to determine whether the local water is safe to drink than to compare it against water from a different place.

A criterion-referenced test (CRT) is a style of test which uses test scores to show how well test takers performed on a given task, not how well they performed compared to other test takers. Most tests and quizzes that are written by school teachers are criterion-referenced tests. In this case, the objective is simply to see whether the test taker can answer the questions correctly. The test giver is not usually trying to compare each person's result against other test takers.

== Standards ==
The considerations of validity and reliability typically are viewed as essential elements for determining the quality of any standardized test. However, professional and practitioner associations frequently have placed these concerns within broader contexts when developing standards and making overall judgments about the quality of any standardized test as a whole within a given context.

=== Evaluation standards ===
In the field of psychometrics, the Standards for Educational and Psychological Testing place standards about validity and reliability, along with errors of measurement and issues related to the accommodation of individuals with disabilities. The third and final major topic covers standards related to testing applications, credentialing, plus testing in program evaluation and public policy.

In the field of evaluation, and in particular educational evaluation, the Joint Committee on Standards for Educational Evaluation has published three sets of standards for evaluations. The Personnel Evaluation Standards was published in 1988, The Program Evaluation Standards (2nd edition) was published in 1994, and The Student Evaluation Standards was published in 2003.

Each publication presents a set of standards for use in a variety of educational settings. The standards provide guidelines for designing, implementing, assessing, and improving the identified form of evaluation. Each of the standards has been placed in one of four fundamental categories to promote educational evaluations that are proper, useful, feasible, and accurate. In these sets of standards, validity and reliability considerations are covered under the accuracy topic. The tests are meant to provide sound, accurate, and credible information about learning and performance; however, most academic tests (standardized or not) offer narrow information of achievement. Relying on a narrow, academic-focused view achievement does not fully represent a person's potential for success (e.g., by not testing interpersonal skills or soft skills).

=== Statistical validity ===
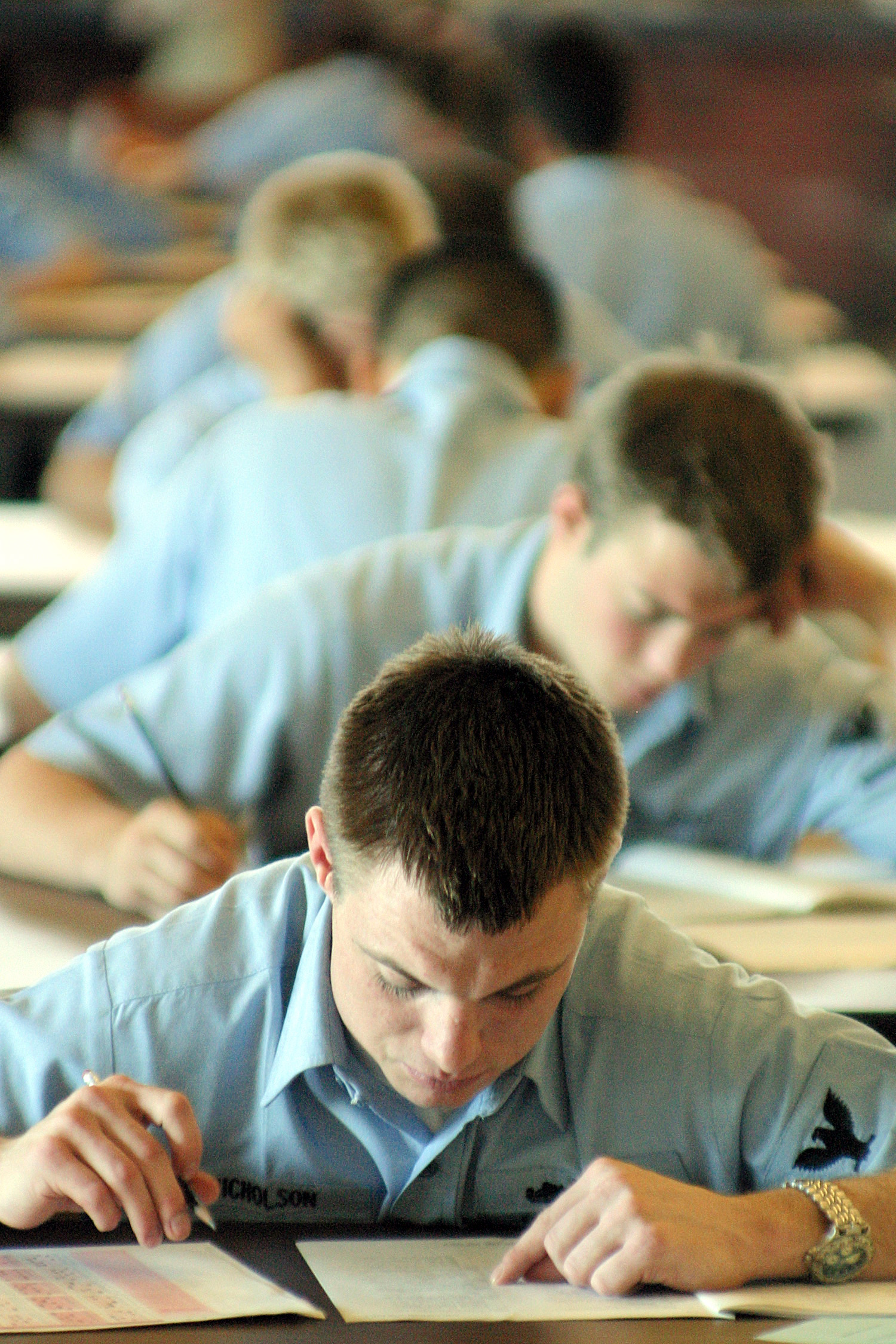
Enlisted members of the military take a paper-based, multiple-choice standardized test, in the hope of earning a promotion. All of them answer the same questions and get graded the same way.

One of the main advantages of larger-scale standardized testing is that the results can be empirically documented; therefore, the test scores can be shown to have a relative degree of validity and reliability, as well as results which are generalizable and replicable. This is often contrasted with grades on a school transcript, which are assigned by individual teachers. When looking at individually assigned grades, it may be difficult to account for differences in educational culture across schools, the difficulty of a given teacher's assignments, differences in teaching style, the pressure for grade inflation, and other techniques and biases that affect grading.

Another advantage is aggregation. A well-designed standardized test provides an assessment of an individual's mastery of a domain of knowledge or skill which at some level of aggregation will provide useful information. That is, while individual assessments may not be accurate enough for practical purposes, the mean scores of classes, schools, branches of a company, or other groups may well provide useful information because of the reduction of error accomplished by increasing the sample size.

== Testing issues not specific to standardization ==
Most tests can be classified on multiple categories. For example, a test can be both standardized and also a high-stakes test, or standardized and also a multiple-choice test. Complaints about "standardized tests" (all test takers take the same test, under reasonably similar conditions, scored the same way) are often focused on concerns unrelated to standardization and apply equally to non-standardized tests. For example, a critic may complain that "the standardized tests are all time-limited tests" (a criticism that is true for many, but not all, annual standardized tests given by schools), but the focus of the criticism is on the time limit, and not on everyone taking the same test and having their answers graded the same way.

=== High-stakes tests ===
Types of tests
	Low-stakes test	High-stakes test
Standardized test	A personality quiz on a website	An educational entrance examination to determine university admission
Non-standardized test	The teacher asks each student to share something they remember from their homework.	The theater holds an audition to determine who will get a starring role.

A high-stakes test is a test with a desired reward for good performance. Some standardized tests, including many of the tests used for university admissions around the world, are high-stakes tests. Most standardized tests, such as ordinary classroom quizzes, are low-stakes tests.

Heavy reliance on high-stakes standardized tests for decision-making is often controversial. A common concern with high-stakes tests is that they measure performance during a single event (e.g., performance during a single audition), when critics believe that a more holistic assessment would be appropriate. Critics often propose emphasizing cumulative or even non-numerical measures, such as classroom grades or brief individual assessments (written in prose) from teachers. Supporters argue that test scores provide a clear-cut, objective standard that serves as a valuable check on grade inflation.

=== Norm-referenced tests ===
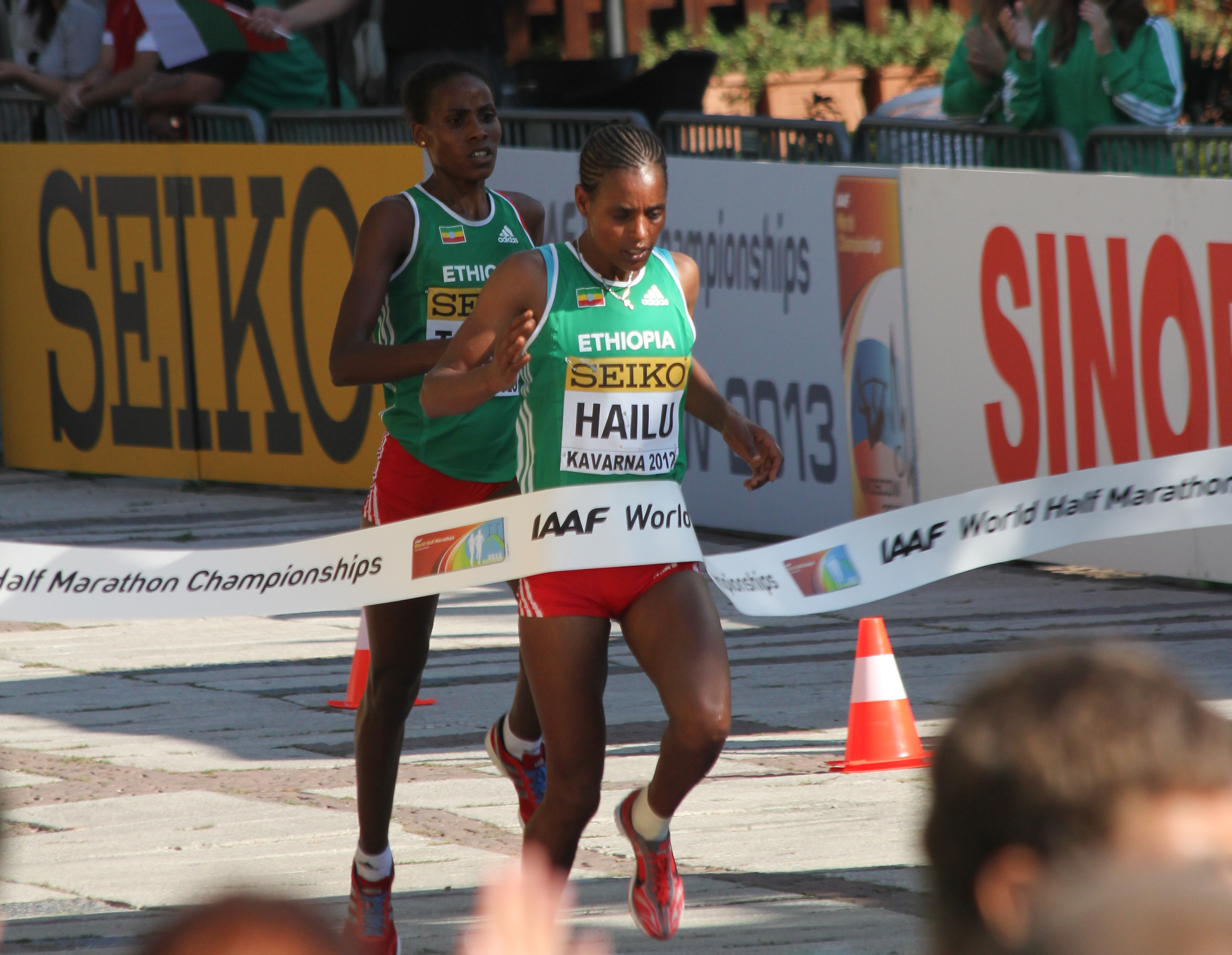
A footrace is an authentic norm-referenced test. The point of the race is to see who runs the fastest, rather than to see whether everyone can run at a certain speed.

A norm-referenced test is one that is designed and scored so that some test takers rank better or worse than others. The ranking provides information about the relative ranking, which is helpful when the goal is to determine who is best (e.g., in elite university admissions).

=== Disagreement with educational standards ===
A criterion-referenced test is more common and more practical when the goal is to know whether the test takers have learned the required material. For example, if the goal is to know whether someone can do parallel parking, then a standardized driving test has the person park the car and measures their performance according to whether it was done correctly and safely.

However, some critics object to standardized tests not because they object to giving students the same test under the reasonably similar conditions and grading the responses the same way, because they object to the type of material that is typically tested by schools. To use the driving test example, a critic might say that it is unnecessary to know whether the driving student can handle parallel parking. In an educational setting, the critics may wish for non-academic skills or soft skills to be tested. Although standardized tests for non-academic attributes such as the Torrance Tests of Creative Thinking exist, schools rarely give standardized tests to measure "initiative, creativity, imagination...curiosity...good will, ethical reflection, or a host of other valuable dispositions and attributes". Instead, the tests given by schools tend to focus less on moral or character development, and more on individual identifiable academic skills, such as reading comprehension and arithmetic.

=== Test anxiety ===
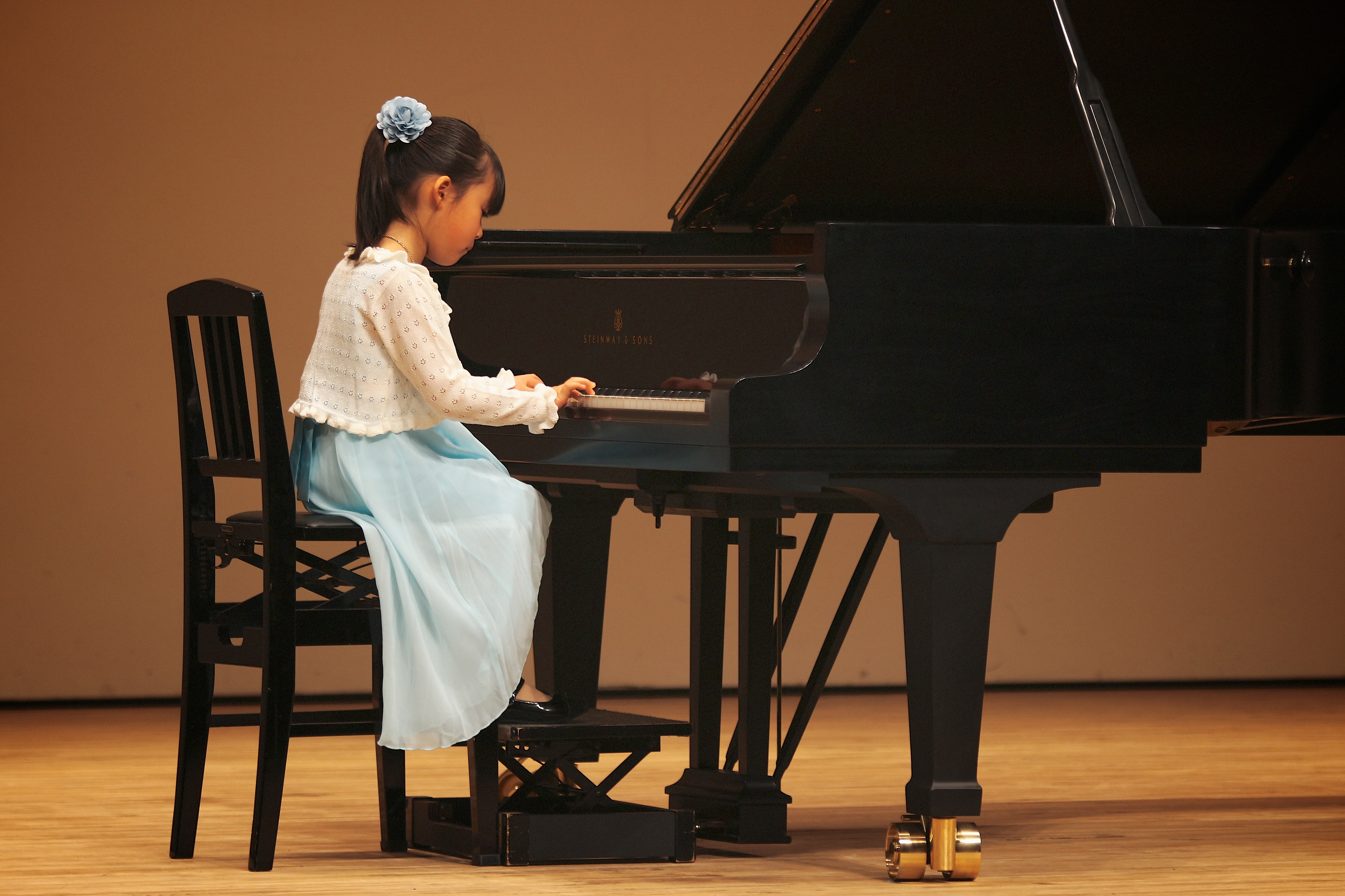
Even when the test taker is well prepared, stage fright and other forms of evaluation-related social anxiety can result in underperformance.

Some people become anxious when taking a test. Between ten and forty percent of students experience test anxiety. Test anxiety applies to both standardized and non-standardized tests.

Test anxiety can appear in any situation in which the person believes that they are being judged by others, especially if they believe that they are unlikely to receive a favorable evaluation. This phenomenon is more common for high-stakes tests than for low-stakes tests. High-stakes tests (whether standardized or non-standardized) can cause test anxiety. Children living in poverty are more likely to be affected by testing anxiety than children from wealthier families.

Some students say they are "bad test takers", meaning that they get nervous and unfocused on tests. For example, during a standardized driving exam, the driving student may be so nervous about the test that they make mistakes. Therefore, while the test is standard and should provide fair results, the test takers claim that they are at a disadvantage compared to test takers who are less nervous.

=== Multiple-choice tests and test formats ===
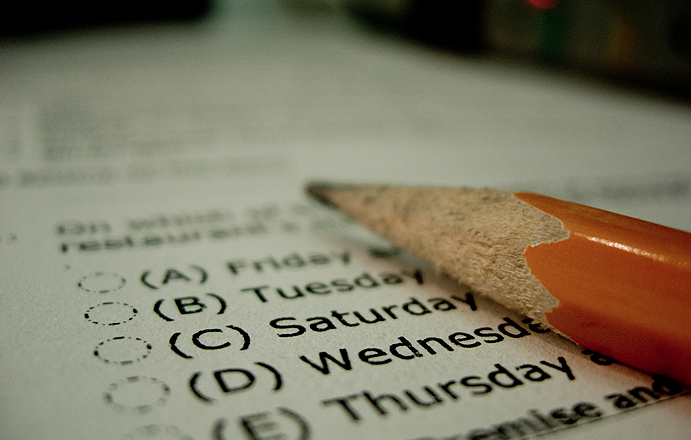
Multiple-choice tests can be standardized or non-standardized tests.

A multiple-choice test provides the test taker with questions paired with a pre-determined list of possible answers. It is a type of closed-ended question. The test taker chooses the correct answer from the list.

Many critics of standardized testing object to the multiple-choice format, which is commonly used for inexpensive, large-scale testing and which is not suitable for some purposes, such as seeing whether the test taker can write a paragraph. However, standardized testing can use any test format, including open-ended questions, so long as all test takers take the same test, under reasonably similar conditions, and get evaluated the same way.

=== Teaching to the test ===
Teaching to the test is a process of deliberately narrowing instruction to focus only on the material that will be measured on the test. For example, if the teacher knows that an upcoming history test will not include any questions about the history of music or art, then the teacher could "teach to the test" by skipping the material in the textbook about music and art. Critics also charge that standardized tests encourage "teaching to the test" at the expense of creativity and in-depth coverage of subjects not on the test. Critics say that teaching to the test disfavors higher-order learning; it transforms what the teachers are allowed to be teaching and heavily limits the amount of other information students learn throughout the years. While it is possible to use a standardized test without letting its contents determine curriculum and instruction, frequently, what is not tested is not taught, and how the subject is tested often becomes a model for how to teach the subject.

Externally imposed tests, such as tests created by a department of education for students in their area, encourage teachers to narrow the curricular format and teach to the test.

Performance-based pay is the idea that teachers should be paid more if the students perform well on the tests, and less if they perform poorly. When teachers or schools are rewarded for better performance on tests, then those rewards encourage teachers to "teach to the test" instead of providing a rich and broad curriculum. In 2007 a qualitative study done by Au Wayne demonstrated that standardized testing narrows the curriculum and encourages teacher-centered instruction instead of student-centered learning. New Jersey Governor Chris Christie proposed educational reform in New Jersey that pressures teachers not only to "teach to the test," but also have their students perform at the potential cost of their salary and job security. The reform called for performance-based pay that depends on students' performances on standardized tests and their educational gains.

Critics contend that overuse and misuse of these tests harms teaching and learning by narrowing the curriculum. According to the group FairTest, when standardized tests are the primary factor in accountability, schools use the tests to narrowly define curriculum and focus instruction. Accountability creates an immense pressure to perform and this can lead to the misuse and misinterpretation of standardized tests.

== Lists of standardized tests ==
- List of admission tests to colleges and universities
- List of standardized tests in the United States

== See also ==
- Achievement test
- Concept inventory – Knowledge assessment tool
- Educational assessment – Educational evaluation method
- Evaluation – Characterizing and appraising something
- Psychometrics – Theory and technique of psychological measurement
  - Item response theory – Paradigm for the design, analysis, and scoring of tests
- Standards-based assessment – Assessment based on specified standards
- Test (assessment) – Educational assessment
- Alternative assessment
- Campbell's law – Adage about perverse incentives
- High school graduation exam – High school leaving examination
- IBM 805 Test Scoring Machine – Test scoring machine released by IBM
- Standards-based education reform – Educational system based on the desired goals
- Volvo effect – Term for a critique of standardized testing
