= Joint Committee on Standards for Educational Evaluation =

The Joint Committee on Standards for Educational Evaluation is an American/Canadian based Standards Developer Organization (SDO). The Joint Committee, created in 1975, represents a coalition of major professional associations formed in 1975 to develop evaluation standards and improve the quality of standardized evaluation. The Committee has thus far published three sets of standards for evaluations. The Personnel Evaluation Standards (2nd edition) was published in 1988 and updated in 2008, The Program Evaluation Standards (2nd edition) was published in 1994 (the third edition of which is in draft form as of 2008), and The Student Evaluation Standards was published in 2003.

The Joint Committee is a private nonprofit organization. It is accredited by the American National Standards Institute (ANSI). Standards approved by ANSI become American National Standards. In addition to setting standards in evaluation, it also is involved in reviewing and updating its published standards (every five years); training policymakers, evaluators, and educators in the use of the standards; and serving as a clearinghouse on evaluation standards literature.

The Committee performs its work on behalf of its constituents, namely, the people and groups involved in conducting educational evaluations and using the results of educational evaluations. The Joint Committee has three sets of standards published at this time: The Student Evaluation Standards, The Personnel Evaluation Standards and The Program Evaluation Standards.

Each publication presents and elaborates a set of standards for use in a variety of educational settings. The standards provide guidelines for designing, implementing, assessing and improving the identified form of evaluation. Each of the standards has been placed in one of four fundamental categories to promote educational evaluations that are proper, useful, feasible, and accurate.

== The Personnel Evaluation Standards ==
The second edition of the Personnel Evaluation Standards (2008) is based on knowledge about personnel evaluation gained from the professional literature and research/development since 1988. In this edition, six new standards were added to the original 21 of the first edition. The Joint Committee on Standards for Educational Evaluation requires that personnel evaluations be ethical, fair, useful, feasible, and accurate. The standards also provide special consideration to issues of diversity.

It is not the intent of these standards to design or promote specific systems of evaluation, rather to ensure that whatever system is in place provides a sound process most likely to produce the desired results.

The four attributes of sound educational evaluation practices are:

- The propriety standards require that evaluations be conducted legally, ethically, and with due regard for the welfare of evaluatees and clients involved in. There are seven standards under this attribute which include service orientation, appropriate policies and procedures, access to evaluation information, interactions with evaluatees, comprehensive evaluation, conflict of interest, and legal viability.
- The utility standards are intended to guide evaluations so that they will be informative, timely, and influential. There are six standards under this attribute which include constructive orientation, defined uses, evaluator qualifications, explicit criteria, functional reporting, and follow-up/professional development.
- The feasibility standards call for evaluation systems that are as easy to implement as possible, efficient in their use of time and resources, adequately funded, and viable from a number of other standpoints. There are three standards under this attribute including practical procedures, political viability, and fiscal viability.
- The accuracy standards require that the obtained information be technically accurate and that conclusions be linked logically to the data. There are eleven standards under this attribute including validity orientation, defined expectations, analysis of context, documented purposes and procedures, defensible information, systemic data control, bias identification and management, analysis of information, justified conclusions, and metaevaluation.

== The Program Evaluation Standards ==
- The utility standards are intended to ensure that an evaluation will serve the information needs of intended users. The utility standards for program evaluation incorporate the following:

- Stakeholder Identification: the people involved in the evaluation and those who will be affected by the evaluation must be identified so that their needs can be addressed.
- Evaluator Credibility: the people conducting the evaluation must be trustworthy and competent to perform the evaluation in order for the evaluation's findings to achieve maximum credibility and acceptance.
- Information Scope and Selection: the collected information must be broadly selected so that it addresses pertinent questions about the program and is able to be responsive to the needs and interests of clients and other specified stakeholders.
- Values Identification: the perspectives, procedures and rationale used to interpret the findings of the evaluation should be carefully described so that the bases for value judgments are clear.
- Report Clarity: an evaluation report must precisely describe the program being evaluated, including its context, purposes, procedures and findings so that the essential information is provided and easy to understand.
- Report Timelines and Dissemination: evaluation reports and any significant interim findings should be disseminated to intended users so that they may be used in a timely fashion.
- Evaluation Impact: the way an evaluation is planned, conducted and reported should encourage follow-through by stakeholders in order to increase the likelihood that the evaluation will be used.

- The feasibility standards are intended to ensure that an evaluation will be realistic, prudent, diplomatic, and frugal. The feasibility standards for program evaluation incorporate the following:

- Practical Procedures: evaluation procedures should be practical in order to keep disruption to a minimum while relevant and needed information is obtained.
- Political Viability: whilst planning and conducting the evaluation one must anticipate the different positions of various interest groups so that their co-operation may be obtained. This will also allow one to avert or counteract any possible attempts by these groups to obstruct evaluation operations or to bias or misapply the evaluation's results.
- Cost Effectiveness: a good evaluation should be efficient and produce information of sufficient value to justify the use of available resources.

- The propriety standards are intended to ensure that an evaluation will be conducted legally, ethically, and with due regard for the welfare of those involved in the evaluation, as well as those affected by its results. The propriety standards for program evaluation incorporate the following:

- Service Orientation
- Formal Agreement
- Rights of Human Subjects
- Human Interactions
- Complete and Fair Assessment
- Disclosure of Findings
- Conflict of Interest
- Fiscal Responsibility

- The accuracy standards are intended to ensure that an evaluation will reveal and convey technically adequate information about the features that determine worth or merit of the program being evaluated. The accuracy standards for program evaluation incorporate the following:

- Program Documentation
- Context Analysis
- Described Purposes and Procedures
- Defensible Information Sources
- Valid Information
- Reliable Information
- Systematic Information
- Analysis of Quantitative Information
- Analysis of Qualitative Information
- Justified Conclusions
- Impartial Reporting
- Meta-Evaluation

== The Student Evaluation Standards ==
- The Propriety standards help ensure that student evaluations are conducted lawfully, ethically, and with regard to the rights of students and other persons affected by student evaluation.
- The Utility standards promote the design and implementation of informative, timely, and useful student evaluations.
- The Feasibility standards help ensure that student evaluations are practical; viable; cost-effective; and culturally, socially, and politically appropriate.
- The Accuracy standards help ensure that student evaluations will provide sound, accurate, and credible information about student learning and performance.

== Sponsoring Organizations ==
The Joint Committee includes sixteen Sponsoring Organizations that reflect a balance of primarily client practitioner and evaluation technical specialist perspectives. These organizations appoint and sponsor a member of the Joint Committee. Each Sponsoring Organization is kept informed of the work of the Joint Committee and is afforded an opportunity to contribute to the standard-setting process. Sponsoring Organizations include the following:

- American Association of School Administrators (AASA)
- American Counseling Association (ACA)
- American Educational Research Association (AERA)
- American Evaluation Association (AEA)
- American Indian Higher Education Consortium (AIHEC)
- American Psychological Association (APA)
- Canadian Evaluation Society (CES)
- Canadian Society for the Study of Education (CSSE)
- Consortium for Research on Educational Assessment and Teacher Effectiveness (CREATE)
- Council of Chief State School Officers (CCSSO)
- National Association of Elementary School Principals (NAESP)
- National Association of School Psychologists (NASP)
- National Association of Secondary School Principals (NASSP)
- National Council on Measurement in Education (NCME)
- National Education Association (NEA)
- National Legislative Program Evaluation Society (NLPES)
- National Rural Education Association (NREA)

== Executive committee ==
Member	Current Term	Organization
Dr. Donald Yarbrough	2009-2012	Chair, At-Large Member
Dr. Patricia McDivitt	2009-2012	Vice-Chair, Association for Assessment in Counseling and Education
Dr. Stephan Henry	2007-2010	American Educational Research Association
Dr. Flora Caruthers	2010-2013	National Legislative Program Evaluation Society
Dr. Leslie Lukin	2010-2013	National Council on Measurement in Education
Dr. Patricia L. Hardre	2012-2015	National Rural Education Association

== Notes ==
1. Joint Committee on Standards for Educational Evaluation
2. Joint Committee on Standards for Educational Evaluation. (1988). The Personnel Evaluation Standards: How to Assess Systems for Evaluating Educators. Newbury Park, CA: Sage Publications.
3. Joint Committee on Standards for Educational Evaluation. (2011). The Program Evaluation Standards. Newbury Park, CA: Sage Publications.
4. Joint Committee on Standards for Educational Evaluation. (2003). The Student Evaluation Standards: How to Improve Evaluations of Students. Newbury Park, CA: Corwin Press.
5. ANSI Membership Directory. ANSI Member Organizations
6. ANSI Online Library - JCSEE Directory. Publication Listing
