= Tamil Nadu State Board =

Examination board in Chennai, India

- Tamil Nadu State Board
- Seal of the State Board of School Examinations (Sec.) & Board of Higher Secondary Examinations
- Abbreviation: SBSEBHSE
- Nickname: மாநிலப் பள்ளித் தேர்வு வாரியம் (பிரிவு.) & மேல்நிலைத் தேர்வு வாரியம், தமிழ்நாடு
- Named after: State Common Board of School Education
- Formation: 2011
- Legal status: State Education Board
- Headquarters: Chennai, Tamil Nadu
- Key people: Dr. Gagandeep Singh (Chairman); S. Seturama Varma (Director)
- Affiliations: •Government of Tamil Nadu •Ministry of Human Resource Development •COBSE •Department of School Education (Tamil Nadu)
- Website: www.tamilnadustateboard.org

The State Board of School Examinations (Sec.) & Board of Higher Secondary Examinations, Tamil Nadu (Abbreviation: SBSEBHSE) is recognized by State Common Board of School Education. this board in located in chennai, is a statutory and autonomous body established under the Government of Tamil Nadu, Act 8/2010 Uniform System of School Education.

== History ==
This SBSEBHSE was passed by the Tamil Nadu of Government (தமிழ்நாடு அரசிதழ்) in its gazette notification in 2011. This state board of school examinations(sec.) & board of higher secondary examinations, board combines two boards. Tamil Nadu State Board is one of the oldest boards of India.

This board was recognized by Council of Boards of School Education (COBSE), which allowed The State Board of School Examinations(Sec.) & Board of Higher Secondary Examinations, Tamil Nadu (SBSEBHSE) to conduct exams and grant certificates. The board is recognized with Government of India Ministry of Human Resource Development (MHRD), Ministry of Education (MoE) and National Testing Agency (NTA).

== Board Syllabus ==
The syllabus for the State Board School Examinations (Sec.) & Board of Higher Secondary Examinations, Tamil Nadu (SBSEBHSE) varies depending on the class and stream (Science, Commerce, Arts).

Class 10th (SSLC) Syllabus: The class 10th syllabus covers core subjects like Mathematics, Science, Social Science, Tamil, and English. It also includes optional subjects like Hindi, etc. The syllabus is designed to prepare students for the Secondary School Examinations (Class 10th board exam).

Class 12th (HSC) Syllabus: The class 12th syllabus varies depending on the stream chosen by the students, such as (Science, Commerce, or Arts). Science stream includes subjects like Physics, Chemistry, Biology, Mathematics, Computer Science etc. Commerce stream includes subjects like Accountancy, Economics, Business Studies, etc. Arts stream includes subjects like History, Political Science, Geography etc. The syllabus is designed to prepare students for the Higher Secondary Examinations (Class 12th board exam).

== Examinations ==
The Tamil Nadu State Board conducts the annual examinations for class 8th, 10th and 12th in the month of march. The board earlier conducted exams twice in a year i.e. first semester in September and second semester in March. Results are announced in between may and June.
