= All India Senior School Certificate Examination =

Secondary education leaving exams in India

- Acronym: AISSCE, SSCE
- Type: Pen-Paper-based standardized test
- Administrator: Central Board of Secondary Education
- Skills tested: Languages, Humanities, Mathematics, Science, Skill Subjects, General Studies, Health and Physical Education, Work Experience
- Purpose: Senior Secondary School Completion
- Duration: 3 hours (Standard subjects); 2 hours (Vocational subjects)
- Score range: 0-500 (600, if 6 subjects are taken)
- Offered: Yearly, between February and April (Note: Practical Exams are usually conducted between December and February)
- Restrictions on attempts: Once. In case of failure, usually supplementary or Compartment exams are allowed.
- Regions: India Foreign: Afghanistan; Bahrain; Bangladesh; Egypt; Ethiopia; Ghana; Indonesia; Iran; Iraq; Japan; Kenya; Kuwait; Liberia; Libya; Malaysia; Myanmar; Nepal; Nigeria; Oman; Qatar; Republic of Benin; Russia; Saudi Arabia; Singapore; Tanzania; Thailand; Uganda; United Arab Emirates; Yemen; (Note: The majority of examinations conducted by CBSE is in coordination with Ministry of External Affairs, Ministry of Education, and the respective national authorities.)
- Languages: English; Hindi
- Annual number of test takers: ▲17,80,365 (Registered 2026); 17,80,365 (Appeared 2026)
- Prerequisites: Intended for Class 12 Students in CBSE-affiliated institutions
- Used by: Colleges and universities; for undergraduate programs
- Qualification rate: 85.20% (2026)
- Website: www.cbse.gov.in

The All India Senior School Certificate Examination or AISSCE also known as Senior School Certificate Examination, SSCE or Class 12 Board Exams, is the final examination conducted every year for Senior School Students by the Central Board of Secondary Education on behalf of the Government of India.

It is the equivalent of the A-level examination in the United Kingdom.

== Examination ==
Each subject in the examination is graded out of 100 marks. For subjects like Physics, Chemistry, Biology, Home Science, Mathematics, Geography, etc. for which practical exams are also conducted, 30/20 marks are reserved for practicals and internals and 70/80 marks for the theory exams. In 2020, even for non-science/lab-based subjects, CBSE issued guidelines to conduct an internal assessment for 20 per cent of the aggregate score, prior to which the theory exam was the sole basis of evaluation till 2019. The theory exams are conducted for a duration of 3 hours, while the duration for practical exams depends on the subject. CBSE Board conducts the 10th and 12th National Level Examinations. Two times in the Year, Midterm and final term examination, which is conducted in November and February–March.

CBSE issued guidelines for the addition of practical marks to mathematics in March 2019. For practical exams, students have to perform practicals in other schools usually assigned by CBSE at random in the nearby state or area, maintain lab records and attend a viva voce. The CBSE gives a list of practical tasks to perform for students appearing for these practical exams.

== List of subjects ==
Subject Code	Subject Name	Exam Duration (Theory)	Theory Marks	Practical or Internal Marks
301	English Core	3 hours	80	20 (internal)
001	English Elective	3 hours	80	20 (internal)
302	Hindi Core	3 hours	80	20 (internal)
002	Hindi Elective	3 hours	80	20 (internal)
041	Standard mathematics	3 hours	80	20 (internal)
241	Applied mathematics	3 hours	80	20 (internal)
042	Physics	3 hours	70	30 (practical)
043	Chemistry	3 hours	70	30 (practical)
044	Biology	3 hours	70	30 (practical)
083	Computer Science	3 hours	70	30 (practical)
030	Economics	3 hours	80	20 (internal)
055	Accountancy	3 hours	80	20 (internal)
054	Business Studies	3 hours	80	20 (internal)
029	Geography	3 hours	70	30 (internal)
028	Political Science	3 hours	80	20 (internal)
039	Sociology	3 hours	80	20 (internal)
039	Psychology	3 hours	70	30 (internal)
045	Biotechnology	3 hours	70	30 (practical)
048	Physical Education	3 hours	70	30 (practical)
074	Legal studies	3 hours	80	20 (internal)
194	Japanese	3 hours	80	20 (internal)
049	Painting	2 hours	30	70 (practical)
118	French	3 hours	80	20 (internal)
322	Sanskrit Core	3 hours	80	20 (internal)
844	Data science	2 hours	80	20 (internal)
076	National Cadet Corps	3 hours	70	30 (practical)
121	Russian	3 hours	80	20 (internal)
120	German	3 hours	80	20 (internal)
116	Arabic	3 hours	80	20 (internal)
816	Horticulture	3 hours	70	30 (practical)
050	Graphics	2 hours	30	70 (practical)
051	Sculpture	2 hours	30	70 (practical)
052	Applied arts	2 hours	30	70 (practical)
046	Engineering Graphics	3 hours		
837	Fashion studies	3 hours		
817	Typography & Computer Application	3 hours		
847	Electronics & Hardware	3 hours		
841	Yoga	2 hours		

=== Commonly opted combinations ===
Stream	Core Subjects	Optional Subjects	Usual career paths
Science (Medical)	Physics; Chemistry; Biology; Biotechnology	Physical education; Painting; Informatics Practices; Computer science; Applied mathematics; & others	Medicine, Pharmacy, Paramedics, Nursing, Dentistry, Veterinary medicine, Research, Scientist, Genetic engineering etc.
Science (Non-medical)	Physics; Chemistry; Standard Mathematics	Physical education; Painting; Informatics Practices; Computer science; Applied mathematics; & others	Engineering, Architecture, Information Technology, Military, Programming, Entrepreneurship, Aviation etc.
Commerce (with maths)	Accountancy; Economics; Business Studies; Standard Mathematics	Physical education; Painting; Informatics Practices; Computer science; Applied mathematics; & others	Finance & Investing, Data analytics, Chartered accountant, Financial Risk Management, Business Administration, FinTech, etc.
Commerce (without maths)	Accountancy; Economics; Business Studies	Physical education; Painting; Informatics Practices; Computer science; Applied mathematics; & others	Accountant, Corporate law, PO, Clerk, Insurance, PR, Marketing, etc.
Humanities	Geography; Political Science; Economics; History; Sociology	Physical education; Painting; Informatics Practices; Computer science; Applied mathematics; & others	Law, Civil services, Journalism, Archaeology, Psychology, Police etc.

== Results ==
The results of the examinations are usually declared in the first week of May to mid-June. In general, about 80% of candidates receive a passing score. The Delhi High Court has directed the Central Board of Secondary Education and Delhi University to discuss the ways by which the results of the main exam, revaluation, and compartment exam can be declared earlier than usual so that candidates do not miss the cut-off dates.

In 2021, due to the COVID-19 crisis, the secondary school exams for classes X and XII had been cancelled.

In the academic year 2021-22, Central Board of Secondary Education (CBSE) announced that the board examinations of class 10 and class 12, All India Secondary School Examination and the All India Senior School Certificate Examination would be held in two terms respectively. The first term examinations were held in November–December 2021 and second term in April–March 2022.

== See also ==
- All India Secondary School Examination
