= GRE Literature in English Test =

Graduate-level standardized test in the US

Graduate Record Examination (Literature in English Subject Test)
- Type: Paper-based standardized test
- Administrator: Educational Testing Service
- Skills tested: Undergraduate level English: Literary analysis; Literary history; Literary criticism
- Purpose: Admissions in graduate programs (e.g. M.A. and Ph.D.) in English (mostly in universities in the United States).
- Year terminated: 2021
- Duration: 2 hours and 50 minutes
- Score range: 200 to 990, in 10-point increments
- Score validity: 5 years
- Offered: 3 times a year, in September, October and April.
- Regions: Worldwide
- Languages: English
- Annual number of test takers: ~2,500-3,500 yearly
- Prerequisites: No official prerequisite. Intended for English bachelor degree graduates or undergraduate students about to graduate. Fluency in English assumed.
- Fee: US$ 150 (Limited offers of "Fee Reduction Program" for U.S. citizens or resident aliens who demonstrate financial need, and for national programs in the USA that work with underrepresented groups.)
- Used by: English departments offering graduate programs (mostly in universities in the United States).
- Website: www.ets.org/gre/subject/about/content/literature_english

The GRE Literature in English Test was a standardized test administered by the Educational Testing Service. It was intended to evaluate applicants seeking admission to a graduate program in English Studies. The test surveyed a wide range of topics related to literature in English, but the focus was mainly on works long accepted as part of the canon.

Scores were scaled and then reported as a number between 200 and 800; however, in recent versions of the test, the maximum and minimum reported scores had been 760 (corresponding to the 99 percentile) and 320 (1 percentile) respectively. The mean score for all test takers from July, 2009, to July, 2012, was 549 with a standard deviation of 99. ETS decided to discontinue the test after April 2021.

== Content specification ==
The test contained 230 questions, grouped in four broad categories. Since many students who apply to graduate programs in English do so during the first half of their fourth year, the scope of most questions was largely that of the first three years of a standard American undergraduate English curriculum. A sampling of test item content is given below:

=== Literary analysis (40-55%) ===
- Conventions and genres
- Allusions and references
- Meaning and tone
- Grammar and rhetoric
- Literary techniques

=== Identification (15-20%) ===
This section tested the ability of examinees to perform recognition of date, author or work by style and/or content. The literary-historical scope of the test is as follows:

- Continental, classical and comparative literature through 1925 (5-10%)
- British literature through 1660 (including John Milton) (25-30%)
- British literature from 1660 to 1925 (25-30%)
- American literature through 1925 (15-25%)
- Literature in English after 1925 (20-30%)

=== Cultural and historical contexts (20-25%) ===
- Literary history
- Cultural history
- Identification of details in a work

=== Literary criticism (10-15%) ===
Identification and analysis of the characteristics and methods of various critical and theoretical approaches.

== See also ==
- Graduate Record Examination
- GRE Biochemistry Test
- GRE Biology Test
- GRE Chemistry Test
- GRE Mathematics Test
- GRE Physics Test
- GRE Psychology Test
- Graduate Management Admission Test (GMAT)
- Graduate Aptitude Test in Engineering (GATE)
