= Bachelor of Music =

Academic degree

A Bachelor of Music (BMus; sometimes conferred as Bachelor of Musical Arts) is an academic degree awarded by a college, university, or conservatory upon completion of a program of study in music. The degree may be awarded for performance, music education, composition, music theory, musicology / music history (musicology degrees may be a Bachelor of Arts rather than a Bachelor of Music), music technology, music therapy, sacred music, music business/music industry, entertainment, music production, or jazz studies. Since the 2010s, some universities have begun offering degrees in music composition with technology, which include traditional theory and musicology courses and sound recording and composition courses using digital technologies.

== Overview ==
In the United States, the Bachelor of Music is a professional degree, and the majority of work consists of prescribed music courses and study in applied music, usually requiring proficiency in an instrument, voice, or conducting. One of the most renowned is Juilliard School in New York, a professional educational arm of the Lincoln Center for the Performing Arts. Juilliard offers bachelor's degrees in music, dance, and drama. Berklee College of Music also offers a variety of such degrees, including a four-year professional degree, as well as instrumental and online undergraduate courses.

In Canada, the BM is often considered an undergraduate degree. Programs typically last from three to four and a half years.

In the United Kingdom, the Bachelor of Music is generally a first degree lasting three years or four years and consisting of a wide range of areas of study (normally including performance, composition, music theory, musicology/music history), but at the University of Oxford and University of Cambridge it was a one-year postgraduate degree which could only be taken if a student were to have been a graduate in music with honors at those universities; the undergraduate course is in the Faculty of Arts and leads to the Bachelor of Arts (and subsequently the Master of Arts (Oxbridge)). In Scotland, as part of its undergraduate Bachelor's degree programme, the Royal Conservatoire of Scotland offers a BMus in Jazz, while Edinburgh University through its Edinburgh College of Art offers a three year BMus degree, with the option for a fourth 'Honours' year, styled 'BMus(Hons)'.

In Australia, Music Bachelor Degree study programs are available at, among others, the University of Sydney, Monash University, the University of New South Wales, the University of Adelaide, Queensland Conservatorium Griffith University, The Western Australian Academy of Performing Arts (WAAPA), and the University of Tasmania. The University of Canberra offers a 'Bachelor of Creative Industries (Contemporary Music Practice)'.

== Abbreviations ==
After a degree holder's name, as on a business card or a CV, the degree is abbreviated in various ways, including: BM, BMus, MusB, or MusBac. Some recipients add an abbreviation for the name of the institution which granted the degree as well, e.g., "Susan Bhattara, BMus(Oxon)"; Oxon is the Latin abbreviation for the University of Oxford.

== Post-graduation options ==
Graduates may apply for jobs in performance, teaching, or arts administration. As well, graduates can apply for jobs that require a bachelor's degree in any subject, such as some entry-level jobs in banking, insurance, sales, and administration. Graduates with an interest in teaching in the school system may go on to complete a teaching degree or diploma. Graduates who have achieved a high standard on their instrument, voice, or another specialisation such as composition or conducting may be eligible to apply for a Master of Music (MMus) if their grades are high enough (a B+ or A− average is typically required). BMus graduates can also apply to a range of graduate programs outside of music, such as library science, business administration or public administration; a B+ or A− average is typically required. Some programs may require BMus graduates to complete preparatory or make-up courses in the field of the master's. As well, some programs require the GRE or GMAT (standardized tests). BMus graduates in some fields, such as composition, music theory, or musicology may be able to apply directly to PhD programs if they have a high average and strong recommendation letters.
