= GRE Physics Test =

Examination

Graduate Record Examination (Physics Subject Test)
- Type: Paper-based standardized test
- Administrator: Educational Testing Service
- Skills tested: Undergraduate level physics: Classical mechanics; Electromagnetism; Optics and wave phenomena; Thermodynamics and statistical mechanics; Quantum mechanics; Atomic physics; Special relativity; Laboratory methods; Specialized topics
- Purpose: Admissions in graduate programs (e.g. MS and PhD) in physics (mostly in universities in the United States).
- Duration: 2 hours
- Score range: 200 to 990, in 10-point increments
- Score validity: 5 years
- Offered: 3 times a year, in September, October, and April through May.
- Regions: Worldwide
- Languages: English
- Annual number of test takers: ~5,000-6,000 yearly
- Prerequisites: No official prerequisite. Intended for physics bachelor degree graduates or undergraduate students about to graduate. Fluency in English assumed.
- Fee: US$ 150 (Limited offers of "Fee Reduction Program" for U.S. citizens or resident aliens who demonstrate financial need, and for national programs in USA that work with under-represented groups.)
- Used by: Physics departments offering graduate programs (mostly in universities in the U.S.).
- Website: www.ets.org/gre/test-takers/subject-tests/about/content-structure.html

The Graduate Record Examination (GRE) physics test is an examination administered by the Educational Testing Service (ETS). The test attempts to determine the extent of the examinees' understanding of fundamental principles of physics and their ability to apply them to problem solving. Many graduate schools require applicants to take the exam and base admission decisions in part on the results.

The scope of the test is largely that of the first three years of a standard United States undergraduate physics curriculum, since many students who plan to continue to graduate school apply during the first half of the fourth year. It consists of 70 five-option multiple-choice questions covering subject areas including the first three years of undergraduate physics.

The International System of Units (SI Units) is used in the test. A table of information representing various physical constants and conversion factors is presented in the test book.

== Major content topics ==
=== 1. Classical mechanics (20%) ===
- kinematics
- Newton's laws
- work and energy
- oscillatory motion
- rotational motion about a fixed axis
- dynamics of systems of particles
- central forces and celestial mechanics
- three-dimensional particle dynamics
- Lagrangian and Hamiltonian formalism
- non-inertial reference frames
- elementary topics in fluid dynamics

=== 2. Electromagnetism (18%) ===
- electrostatics
- currents and DC circuits
- magnetic fields in free space
- Lorentz force
- induction
- Maxwell's equations and their applications
- electromagnetic waves
- AC circuits
- magnetic and electric fields in matter

=== 3. Optics and wave phenomena (8%) ===
- wave properties
- superposition
- interference
- diffraction
- geometrical optics
- polarization
- Doppler effect

=== 4. Thermodynamics and statistical mechanics (10%) ===
- laws of thermodynamics
- thermodynamic processes
- equations of state
- ideal gases
- kinetic theory
- ensembles
- statistical concepts and calculation of thermodynamic quantities
- thermal expansion and heat transfer

=== 5. Quantum mechanics (13%) ===
- fundamental concepts
- solutions of the Schrödinger equation
  - square wells
  - harmonic oscillators
  - hydrogenic atoms
- spin
- angular momentum
- wave function symmetry
- elementary perturbation theory

=== 6. Atomic physics (10%) ===
- properties of electrons
- Bohr model
- energy quantization
- atomic structure
- atomic spectra
- selection rules
- black-body radiation
- x-rays
- atoms in electric and magnetic fields

=== 7. Special relativity (6%) ===
- introductory concepts
- time dilation
- length contraction
- simultaneity
- energy and momentum
- four-vectors and Lorentz transformation
- velocity addition

=== 8. Laboratory methods (6%) ===
- data and error analysis
- electronics
- instrumentation
- radiation detection
- counting statistics
- interaction of charged particles with matter
- lasers and optical interferometers
- dimensional analysis
- fundamental applications of probability and statistics

=== 9. Specialized topics (9%) ===
- Nuclear and particle physics
  - nuclear properties
  - radioactive decay
  - fission and fusion
  - reactions
  - fundamental properties of elementary particles
- Condensed matter
  - crystal structure
  - x-ray diffraction
  - thermal properties
  - electron theory of metals
  - semiconductors
  - superconductors
- miscellaneous
  - astrophysics
  - mathematical methods
    - single and multivariate calculus
    - coordinate systems (rectangular, cylindrical, spherical)
    - vector algebra and vector differential operators
    - Fourier series
    - partial differential equations
    - boundary value problems
    - matrices and determinants
    - functions of complex variables
  - computer applications

== See also ==
- Graduate Record Examination
- GRE Biochemistry Test
- GRE Biology Test
- GRE Chemistry Test
- GRE Literature in English Test
- GRE Mathematics Test
- GRE Psychology Test
- Graduate Management Admission Test (GMAT)
- Graduate Aptitude Test in Engineering (GATE)
