= GRE Chemistry Test =

US Standardised test in subject knowledge

Graduate Record Examination (Chemistry Subject Test)
- Type: Paper-based standardized test
- Administrator: Educational Testing Service
- Skills tested: Undergraduate level chemistry: Analytical chemistry; Organic chemistry; Inorganic chemistry; Physical chemistry
- Purpose: Admissions in graduate programs (e.g. M.S. and Ph.D.) in chemistry (mostly in universities in the United States).
- Year terminated: 2023
- Duration: 2 hours and 50 minutes
- Score range: 200 to 990, in 10-point increments
- Score validity: 5 years
- Offered: 3 times a year, in September, October and April.
- Regions: Worldwide
- Languages: English
- Annual number of test takers: ~3,000-4,000 yearly
- Prerequisites: No official prerequisite. Intended for chemistry bachelor degree graduates or undergraduate students about to graduate. Fluency in English assumed.
- Fee: US$ 150 (Limited offers of "Fee Reduction Program" for U.S. citizens or resident aliens who demonstrate financial need, and for national programs in the USA that work with underrepresented groups.)
- Used by: Chemistry departments offering graduate programs (mostly in universities in the United States).
- Website: www.ets.org/gre/subject/about/content/chemistry

The Graduate Record Examinations (GRE) Subject Test in Chemistry was a standardized test in the United States created by the Educational Testing Service (ETS). Designed to assess a candidate's potential for graduate or post-graduate study, the exam covered various chemistry subfields: analytical chemistry (15%), inorganic chemistry (25%), organic chemistry (30%), and physical chemistry (30%).

Unlike the GRE General Test, which is typically computer-based, the Chemistry Subject Test was paper-based. It consisted of 130 questions to be completed within 2 hours and 50 minutes. Scores on this exam were sometimes required for admission to chemistry Ph.D. programs in the United States.

Results were reported on a scaled range between 200 and 990. However, in later versions, the reported scores spanned from 460 (1st percentile) to 940 (99th percentile). For test-takers between July 2009 and July 2012, the mean score was 703 with a standard deviation of 115.

Historically, the exam was administered three times a year, on a Saturday in September, October, and April, with a registration deadline approximately five weeks before the test date. The ETS discontinued the Chemistry Subject Test following the April 2023 administration.

== See also ==
- Graduate Record Examination
- GRE Biochemistry Test
- GRE Biology Test
- GRE Literature in English Test
- GRE Mathematics Test
- GRE Physics Test
- GRE Psychology Test
- Graduate Management Admission Test (GMAT)
- Graduate Aptitude Test in Engineering (GATE)
