= GRE Biochemistry, Cell and Molecular Biology Test =

Graduate-level standardized test in the US

Graduate Record Examination (Biochemistry Subject Test)
- Type: Paper-based standardized test
- Administrator: Educational Testing Service
- Skills tested: Undergraduate level biochemistry: Cellular and molecular biology; Biochemistry; Genetics
- Purpose: Admissions in graduate programs (e.g. M.S. and Ph.D.) in biochemistry (mostly in universities in the United States)
- Duration: 2 hours and 50 minutes
- Score range: 200 to 990, in 10-point increments
- Score validity: 5 years
- Offered: 3 times a year, in September, October and April
- Regions: Worldwide
- Languages: English
- Annual number of test takers: ~1,500-2,000 yearly
- Prerequisites: No official prerequisite. Intended for biochemistry bachelor degree graduates or undergraduate students about to graduate. Fluency in English assumed.
- Fee: US$ 150 (Limited offers of "Fee Reduction Program" for U.S. citizens or resident aliens who demonstrate financial need, and for national programs in the USA that work with underrepresented groups.)
- Used by: Biochemistry departments offering graduate programs (mostly in universities in the United States).
- Website: www.ets.org/gre/subject/about/content/biochemistry

GRE Subject Biochemistry, Cell and Molecular Biology was a standardized exam provided by ETS (Educational Testing Service) that was discontinued in December 2016. It is a paper-based exam and there are no computer-based versions of it. ETS places this exam three times per year: once in April, once in October and once in November. Some graduate programs in the United States recommend taking this exam, while others require this exam score as a part of the application to their graduate programs. ETS sends a bulletin with a sample practice test to each candidate after registration for the exam. There are 180 questions within the biochemistry subject test.

Scores are scaled and then reported as a number between 200 and 990; however, in recent versions of the test, the maximum and minimum reported scores have been 760 (corresponding to the 99 percentile) and 320 (1 percentile) respectively. The mean score for all test takers from July, 2009, to July, 2012, was 526 with a standard deviation of 95. After learning that test content from editions of the GRE® Biochemistry, Cell and Molecular Biology (BCM) Test has been compromised in Israel, ETS made the decision not to administer this test worldwide in 2016–17.

== Content specification ==
Since many students who apply to graduate programs in biochemistry do so during the first half of their fourth year, the scope of most questions is largely that of the first three years of a standard American undergraduate biochemistry curriculum. A sampling of test item content is given below:

=== Biochemistry (36%) ===
A Chemical and Physical Foundations

Thermodynamics and kinetics Redox states Water, pH, acid-base reactions and buffers Solutions and equilibria Solute-solvent interactions Chemical interactions and bonding Chemical reaction mechanisms

B Structural Biology: Structure, Assembly, Organization and Dynamics Small molecules Macromolecules (e.g., nucleic acids, polysaccharides, proteins and complex lipids) Supramolecular complexes (e.g., membranes, ribosomes and multienzyme complexes)

C Catalysis and Binding

Enzyme reaction mechanisms and kinetics Ligand-protein interaction (e.g., hormone receptors, substrates and effectors, transport proteins and antigen-antibody interactions)

D Major Metabolic Pathways

Carbon, nitrogen and sulfur assimilation Anabolism Catabolism Synthesis and degradation of macromolecules

E Bioenergetics (including respiration and photosynthesis)

Energy transformations at the substrate level Electron transport Proton and chemical gradients Energy coupling (e.g., phosphorylation and transport)

F Regulation and Integration of Metabolism

Covalent modification of enzymes Allosteric regulation Compartmentalization Hormones

G Methods

Biophysical approaches (e.g., spectroscopy, x-ray, crystallography, mass spectroscopy) Isotopes Separation techniques (e.g., centrifugation, chromatography and electrophoresis) Immunotechniques

=== Cell biology (28%) ===
Methods of importance to cellular biology, such as fluorescence probes (e.g., FRAP, FRET and GFP) and imaging, will be covered as appropriate within the context of the content below.

A. Cellular Compartments of Prokaryotes and Eukaryotes: Organization, Dynamics and Functions

Cellular membrane systems (e.g., structure and transport across membrane) Nucleus (e.g., envelope and matrix) Mitochondria and chloroplasts (e.g., biogenesis and evolution)

B. Cell Surface and Communication Extracellular matrix (including cell walls) Cell adhesion and junctions Signal transduction Receptor function Excitable membrane systems

C. Cytoskeleton, Motility and Shape Regulation of assembly and disassembly of filament systems Motor function, regulation and diversity

D. Protein, Processing, Targeting and Turnover

Translocation across membranes Posttranslational modification Intracellular trafficking Secretion and endocytosis Protein turnover (e.g., proteosomes, lysosomes, damaged protein response)

E. Cell Division, Differentiation and Development

Cell cycle, mitosis and cytokinesis Meiosis and gametogenesis Fertilization and early embryonic development (including positional information, homeotic genes, tissue-specific expression, nuclear and cytoplasmic interactions, growth factors and induction, environment, stem cells and polarity)

=== Molecular biology (36%) ===
A. Genetic Foundations

Mendelian and non-Mendelian inheritance Transformation, transduction and conjugation Recombination and complementation Mutational analysis Genetic mapping and linkage analysis

B. Chromatin and Chromosomes

Karyotypes Translocations, inversions, deletions and duplications Aneuploidy and polyploidy Structure Epigenetics

C. Genomics

Genome structure Physical mapping Repeated DNA and gene families Gene identification Transposable elements Bioinformatics Proteomics Molecular evolution

D. Genome Maintenance

DNA replication DNA damage and repair DNA modification DNA recombination and gene conversion

E. Gene Expression/Recombinant DNA Technology

The genetic code Transcription/transcriptional profiling RNA processing Translation

F. Gene Regulation

Positive and negative control of the operon Promoter recognition by RNA polymerases Attenuation and antitermination Cis-acting regulatory elements Trans-acting regulatory factors Gene rearrangements and amplifications Small non-coding RNA (e.g., siRNA, microRNA)

G. Viruses

Genome replication and regulation Virus assembly Virus-host interactions

H. Methods

Restriction maps and PCR Nucleic acid blotting and hybridization DNA cloning in prokaryotes and eukaryotes Sequencing and analysis Protein-nucleic acid interaction Transgenic organisms Microarrays

== See also ==
- Graduate Record Examination
- GRE Biology Test
- GRE Chemistry Test
- GRE Literature in English Test
- GRE Mathematics Test
- GRE Physics Test
- GRE Psychology Test
- Graduate Management Admission Test (GMAT)
- Graduate Aptitude Test in Engineering (GATE)
