= GRE Biology Test =

Graduate-level standardized test in the US

Graduate Record Examination (Biology Subject Test)
- Type: Paper-based standardized test
- Administrator: Educational Testing Service
- Skills tested: Undergraduate level biology: Cellular and molecular biology; Organismal biology; Ecology and evolution
- Purpose: Admissions in graduate programs (e.g. M.S. and Ph.D.) in biology (mostly in universities in the United States).
- Year terminated: 2021
- Duration: 2 hours and 50 minutes
- Score range: 200 to 990, in 10-point increments
- Score validity: 5 years
- Offered: 3 times a year, in September, October and April.
- Regions: Worldwide
- Languages: English
- Annual number of test takers: ~2,000-2,500 yearly
- Prerequisites: No official prerequisite. Intended for biology bachelor degree graduates or undergraduate students about to graduate. Fluency in English assumed.
- Fee: US$ 150 (Limited offers of "Fee Reduction Program" for U.S. citizens or resident aliens who demonstrate financial need, and for national programs in the USA that work with underrepresented groups.)
- Used by: Biology departments offering graduate programs (mostly in universities in the United States).
- Website: www.ets.org/gre/subject/about/content/biology

The GRE subject test in biology was a standardized test in the United States created by the Educational Testing Service, and was designed to assess a candidate's potential for graduate or post-graduate study in the field of biology. The test was comprehensive and covered—in equal proportions—molecular biology, organismal biology, and ecology and evolution. ETS took the decision to discontinue the test after April 2021.

This exam, like all the GRE subject tests, was paper-based, as opposed to the GRE general test which is usually computer-based. It contains 194 questions which were to be answered within 2 hours and 50 minutes. Scores on this exam were required for entrance to some biology Ph.D. programs in the United States.

Scores were scaled and then reported as a number between 200 and 990; however, in recent versions of the test, the maximum and minimum reported scores were 940 (corresponding to the 99 percentile) and 400 (1 percentile) respectively. The mean score for all test takers from July, 2009, to July, 2012, was 658 with a standard deviation of 123.

Tests generally took place three times per year, on one Saturday in each of September, October, and April.

== Content specification ==
Since many students who apply to graduate programs in biology do so during the first half of their fourth year, the scope of most questions is largely that of the first three years of a standard American undergraduate biology curriculum. A sampling of test item content is given below:

=== Cell and molecular biology (33–35%) ===
- Cell biology
- Metabolism
- Genetics
- Microbiology/immunology

=== Organismal biology (33–34%) ===
- Animal anatomy and physiology
- Plant anatomy and physiology
- Biodiversity

=== Ecology and evolution (33–34%) ===
- Ecosystems
- Behavioral ecology
- Evolutionary processes
- History of life

== See also ==
- Graduate Record Examination
- GRE Biochemistry Test
- GRE Chemistry Test
- GRE Literature in English Test
- GRE Mathematics Test
- GRE Physics Test
- GRE Psychology Test
- Graduate Management Admission Test (GMAT)
- Graduate Aptitude Test in Engineering (GATE)
