= GRE Mathematics Test =

Standardized mathematics test

Graduate Record Examination (Mathematics Subject Test)
- Type: Paper-based standardized test
- Administrator: Educational Testing Service
- Skills tested: Undergraduate level mathematics: Calculus; Algebra; Additional topics
- Purpose: Admissions in graduate programs (e.g. M.S. and Ph.D.) in mathematics (mostly in universities in the United States).
- Duration: 2 hours and 50 minutes
- Score range: 200 to 990, in 10-point increments
- Score validity: 5 years
- Offered: 3 times a year, in September, October and April.
- Regions: Worldwide
- Languages: English
- Annual number of test takers: ~4,000-5,000 yearly
- Prerequisites: No official prerequisite. Intended for mathematics bachelor degree graduates or undergraduate students about to graduate. Fluency in English assumed.
- Fee: US$ 150 (Limited offers of "Fee Reduction Program" for U.S. citizens or resident aliens who demonstrate financial need, and for national programs in the USA that work with underrepresented groups.)
- Used by: Mathematics departments offering graduate programs (mostly in universities in the United States).
- Website: www.ets.org/gre/test-takers/subject-tests/about/content-structure.html#accordion-792530b110-item-ab30804f15

The GRE subject test in mathematics is a standardized test in the United States created by the Educational Testing Service (ETS), and is designed to assess a candidate's potential for graduate or post-graduate study in the field of mathematics. It contains questions from many fields of mathematics; about 50% of the questions come from calculus (including pre-calculus topics, multivariate calculus, and differential equations), 25% come from algebra (including linear algebra, abstract algebra, and number theory), and 25% come from a broad variety of other topics typically encountered in undergraduate mathematics courses, such as point-set topology, probability and statistics, geometry, and real analysis.

Up until the September 2023 administration, the GRE subject test in Mathematics was paper-based, as opposed to the GRE general test which is usually computer-based. Since then, it's been moved online. It contains approximately 66 multiple-choice questions, which are to be answered within 2 hours and 50 minutes. Scores on this exam are required for entrance to most math Ph.D. programs in the United States.

Scores are scaled and then reported as a number between 200 and 990; however, in recent versions of the test, the maximum and minimum reported scores have been 920 and 400, which correspond to the 99th percentile and the 1st percentile, respectively. The mean score for all test takers from July 1, 2011, to June 30, 2014, was 659, with a standard deviation of 137.

Prior to October 2001, a significant percentage of students were achieving perfect scores on the exam, which made it difficult for competitive programs to differentiate between students in the upper percentiles. As a result, the test was reworked and renamed "The Mathematics Subject Test (Rescaled)". According to ETS, "Scores earned on the test after October 2001 should not be compared to scores earned prior to that date."

Tests generally take place three times per year, within an approximately 14-day window in each of September, October, and April. Students must register for the exam approximately five weeks before the administration of the exam.

== Test content ==
The test covers topics from a typical undergraduate mathematics degree.

=== Calculus (50%) ===
- Differential calculus of one or more variables:
  - Integral
  - Analytic geometry
  - Trigonometry
  - Differential equations

=== Algebra (25%) ===
- Secondary school mathematical operations
- Linear algebra:
  - Matrix
  - System of linear equations
  - Vector space
  - Linear map
  - Characteristic polynomial
  - Eigenvalues and eigenvectors
- Abstract algebra:
  - Group theory
  - Ring
  - Module
  - Field
  - Number theory

=== Other topics (25%) ===
Specialized topics taught in most universities.

- Real analysis:
  - Number
  - Function
  - Sequence
  - Series
  - Continuous function
  - Differentiable function
  - Riemann integral
  - Topological space of $\mathbb{R}$ and $\mathbb{R}^n$
- Discrete mathematics:
  - Logic
  - Set theory
  - Combinatorics
  - Graph theory
  - Algorithm
- General topology
- Geometry
- Complex analysis
- Probability and Statistics
- Numerical analysis

== See also ==
- Graduate Record Examination
- GRE Biochemistry Test
- GRE Biology Test
- GRE Chemistry Test
- GRE Literature in English Test
- GRE Physics Test
- GRE Psychology Test
- Graduate Management Admission Test (GMAT)
- Graduate Aptitude Test in Engineering (GATE)
