= Gace =

Gace may refer to:

== Places ==
- Gacé, commune in the Orne in France
- Gače, abandoned settlement near Kočevje in Slovenia

== People ==
- Gace Brulé (c. 1160 – after 1213), French trouvère
- Anita Gaće (born 1983), Croatian handballer
- Aurela Gaçe (born 1974), Albanian singer
- Ismaël Gace (born 1986), French football defender
- William Gace (fl. 1580), English translator

== Other uses ==
- GACE, standardized test in the U.S. state of Georgia
- GACE, Georgia Association of Code Enforcement
