= Murley =

Murley is a surname. Notable people with the surname include:

- Matt Murley (born 1979), American ice hockey player
- Mike Murley (born 1961), Canadian jazz saxophonist and composer
- Reginald Murley (1916–1997), British surgeon
- Robert S. Murley, American businessman and philanthropist
