= Victor Cheng =

Victor Cheng is a former McKinsey & Company management consultant, strategic planning consultant, public speaker, and author of several books on business.

He is a graduate of Stanford University with a BA in Economics and an MA in Sociology. Victor started his career as a management consultant with McKinsey & Company and later held senior management positions with Live Person and Art Technology Group (since acquired by Oracle Software).

As a business consultant, Victor advises owners and CEOs of small businesses and Inc. 500-calibre companies in their corporate decision-making. He is a contributor to Entrepreneur.com and writes on topics of leadership and human capital in fast-growing small businesses. Victor also serves as an expert source for media outlets including MSNBC, Fox Business Network, TIME, Forbes, Fortune Small Business, Inc. Magazine, Entrepreneur, and The Wall Street Journal.

He is recognised as the author of the book titled "Case Interview Secrets: A Former McKinsey Interviewer Reveals How to Get Multiple Job Offers in Consulting." Additionally, he is the founder of CaseInterview.com, a blog that caters to individuals who aspire to pursue careers in management consulting. He has garnered significant recognition as an authority on the case interview, which is a job interview format commonly used in the management consulting industry. Furthermore, he has established himself as a commentator on the management consulting industry, often sought after for his insights and expertise in the field.
