= GRE Economics Test =

Standardized test in the United States

Graduate Record Examination (Economics Subject Test)
- Administrator: Educational Testing Service
- Skills tested: Undergraduate level economics
- Purpose: Admissions in graduate programs (e.g. MA, MS, and PhD) in economics
- Year terminated: 2001
- Score range: 200–800
- Regions: Worldwide
- Languages: English
- Prerequisites: No official prerequisite. Intended for economics bachelor degree graduates or undergraduate students about to graduate. Fluency in English assumed.

The GRE subject test in economics was a standardized test administered by the Educational Testing Service. It was intended to evaluate applicants seeking admission to a graduate program in economics. It was discontinued in April 2001.

As is the case with many, or even most, standardized tests, males taking the GRE subject test in economics tended to score higher than their female counterparts. Academic investigation looking at evidence of why this occurred on this specific test is inconclusive, finding mixed evidence across multiple hypotheses.

== See also ==
- Graduate Record Examinations
- List of admission tests to colleges and universities
