= TSE (examination) =

Standardized test measuring proficiency in spoken English

The Test of Spoken English (TSE) was an oral test developed by Educational Testing Service which measured the ability of nonnative English speakers to communicate effectively. As of March 2010, the TSE has been superseded by the speaking portion of the TOEFL iBT as well as by the SPEAK test.

Before its retirement, TSE scores were used by academic institutions, corporations, government agencies, health care systems, and other organizations to guide their decisions regarding graduate assistantships in teaching and research, hiring new workers, and licensing and certifying existing employees.

== Scoring ==
The TSE score consisted of a single score of communicative language ability, which was reported on a scale of 20 to 60. Assigned score levels were averaged across items and raters, and the scores were reported in increments of five (i.e., 20, 25, 30, 35, 40, 45, 50, 55, and 60).

== See also ==
- SPEAK (test)
- The speaking module of the IELTS test
