= In-basket test =

Test to assess employee performance

An in-basket test or an in-basket exercise is a test used by companies or governments in hiring and promoting employees. During the test, job applicants receive a number of mails, telephone calls, documents and memos. They then have a limited period of time to set priorities, organize their working schedule accordingly and respond to mail and phone calls.

It also helps in acquainting employees about their job where a number of problems are kept in the "in basket" (usually kept on the desk of the employee). The worker has to look at the problems (which could also be complaints from different employees) and simultaneously deal with those problems. As the employee solves these problems, they transfer them to the "out-basket".

In-basket exercises are often part of assessment centers that are comprehensive multi-day assessments involving a variety of simulation exercises and tests, typically used to identify management talent.

The test was invented by Norman O. Frederiksen and colleagues at Educational Testing Service in the 1950s.

== See also ==
- Recruitment
- Job interview
- Case interview
