= GRE Psychology Test =

Graduate-level standardized test in the US

Graduate Record Examination (Psychology Subject Test)
- Type: Paper-based standardized test
- Administrator: Educational Testing Service
- Skills tested: Undergraduate level psychology: Experimental: Learning; Language; Memory; Thinking; Sensation and perception; Physiological / behavioral neuroscience; Social: Clinical and abnormal; Lifespan development (childhood, adolescence, aging); Personality; Social; Other areas: General; Measurement and methodology
- Purpose: Admissions in graduate programs (e.g. M.A. and Ph.D.) in psychology (mostly in universities in the United States).
- Duration: 2 hours and 50 minutes
- Score range: 200 to 990, in 10-point increments
- Score validity: 5 years
- Offered: 3 times a year, in September, October and April.
- Regions: Worldwide
- Languages: English
- Annual number of test takers: ~6,000-7,000 yearly
- Prerequisites: No official prerequisite. Intended for psychology bachelor degree graduates or undergraduate students about to graduate. Fluency in English assumed.
- Fee: US$ 150 (Limited offers of "Fee Reduction Program" for U.S. citizens or resident aliens who demonstrate financial need, and for national programs in the USA that work with underrepresented groups.)
- Used by: Psychology departments offering graduate programs (mostly in universities in the United States).
- Website: www.ets.org/gre/subject/about/content/psychology

The GRE Psychology subject test is a standardized test used in admission decisions by some graduate programs in psychology in several English-speaking countries, especially in the United States.

== Structure ==
There are three major components to this test: (1) Experimental, (2) Social, and (3) Other areas. The score ranges from 200 to 880, although 90% of test-takers score between 440 and 760, with 50th percentile around 615. The average score on Psychology subject test is 577 at Master's level and 633 at Doctoral level.

Test Item Development

The questions used for the GRE Psychology Test are written by a committee of six faculty members (many who did not know how the test was designed until they were asked to join the committee) from various colleges and universities throughout the United States. Each member writes 15-20 test items each year, as well as, many other faculty members write and submit additional items. These items are then discussed by the committee over a three-day session. During this time, the members accept, reword, or reject the submitted items from the various faculty members. After the draft of questions are assembled, the test is then given to a GRE Sensitivity Committee to screen for items that may not "represent ethnic minorities, women, people with disabilities, and other groups in a favorable light and [to ensure] that the items are not likely to offend anyone" (Kalat & Matlin, 2000, p. 25). While items are not put on the test as "experimental items" that will not be scored, point-biserial correlations and the percentage of students who answered each item correctly are examined after each test administration.

== Use in Admissions ==
Some graduate programs do not require submission of Psychology subject test scores, whereas in other programs it is recommended or mandatory. Among those universities that do require Psychology subject test, the minimum requirements vary. For example, applicants for the Ph.D. program in Clinical Psychology at Hofstra University are required to have a Psychology subject score no lower than 65th percentile (about 660 points)

== Predictiveness of the GRE Psychology Test ==
Based on data collected from 1986 to 1990, correlations were conducted between first-year graduate school GPAs and undergraduate GPA, as well as, various different GRE tests and subtests. The GRE Psychology Test shows to correlate better with first-year graduate school GPAs than does the GRE General Test (r = .33); the GRE Psychology Test correlates equivocally with undergraduate GPA correlations (both equal r = .37). However, it is also stated that a GRE subject test correlates with degree attainment only r = .21. While it has strong correlations with some facets of graduate school, overall it does not predict who will graduate and who will not.

== See also ==
- Graduate Record Examination
- GRE Biochemistry Test
- GRE Biology Test
- GRE Chemistry Test
- GRE Literature in English Test
- GRE Mathematics Test
- GRE Physics Test
