= Praxis test =

American teacher certification examination

A Praxis test is one of a series of American teacher certification exams written and administered by the Educational Testing Service. Various Praxis tests are usually required before, during, and after teacher training courses in the U.S.

To be a teacher in about half of the states in the US, the Praxis test is required. It usually consists of two separate tests, Praxis 1 and 2. In some states, alternative teacher certification programs allow prospective educators to obtain licensure without taking Praxis tests.

The Praxis I, or Pre-Professional Skills Test (PPST), consisted of three exams: reading, writing, and mathematics. On September 1, 2014, ETS transitioned to the Praxis "CASE" or "Core Academic Skills for Educators" which also consists of reading, writing, and mathematics exams. These sections can be taken as a combined test or separately. In most colleges and universities, a passing score must be earned for admission to teacher education. In most states, a passing score must be earned before the teacher education graduate can apply for their teaching license or certificate.

The Praxis II assessments cover many different subject areas. Each state requires a different combination of Praxis II exams for certification. In many states, these include a content knowledge and a pedagogy exam. In some states, students must pass these exams before being accepted into the student teaching component of the program. Many states use the Praxis II tests to determine highly qualified teachers status under the No Child Left Behind Act. The Praxis II School Counseling specialty exam is used by some states as a licensure requirement to practice professional school counseling.

It replaced the National Teacher Examination (NTE), also administered by ETS.

== List of current Praxis II subject tests ==
- Art: Content and Analysis
- Art: Content Knowledge
- American Sign Language
- Biology and General Science
- Biology: Content Essays
- Biology: Content Knowledge
- Braille Proficiency
- Business Education: Content Knowledge
- Chemistry: Short Word Essays
- Chemistry: Content Knowledge
- Chemistry, Physics and General Science
- Chinese (Mandarin): World Language
- Citizenship Education: Content Knowledge
- Communication
- Cooperative Education
- Driver Education
- Early Childhood: Content Essays
- Early Childhood Education
- Earth and Space Sciences: Content Knowledge
- Economics
- Education of Deaf and Hard of Hearing Students
- Education of Young Children
- Educational Leadership: Administration and Supervision
- Elementary Education: Content Knowledge
- Elementary Education: Curriculum, Instruction and Assessment
- Elementary Education: Instructional Practice and Applications
- Elementary Education: Multiple Subjects
- English Language Arts: Content and Analysis
- English Language Arts: Content Knowledge
- English Language, Literature and Composition: Content and Analysis
- English Language, Literature and Composition: Content Knowledge
- English Language, Literature and Composition: Pedagogy
- English to Speakers of Other Languages
- Environmental Education
- Family and Consumer Sciences
- French: World Language
- Fundamental Subjects: Content Knowledge
- General Science: Content Essays
- General Science: Content Knowledge
- Geography
- German: World Language
- Gifted Education
- Government/Political Science
- Health and Physical Education: Content Knowledge
- Health Education
- Interdisciplinary Early Childhood Education
- Journalism
- Latin
- Library Media Specialist
- Life Science: Pedagogy
- Marketing Education
- Mathematics: Content Knowledge
- Mathematics: Pedagogy
- Middle School: Content Knowledge
- Middle School English Language Arts
- Middle School Mathematics
- Middle School: Multiple Subjects
- Middle School Science
- Middle School Social Studies
- Music: Analysis
- Music: Concepts and Processes
- Music: Content and Instruction
- Music: Content Knowledge
- Physical Education: Content and Design
- Physical Education: Content Knowledge
- Physical Education: Movement Forms - Analysis and Design
- Physical Science: Content Knowledge
- Physical Science: Pedagogy
- Physics: Content Essays
- Physics: Content Knowledge
- Pre-Kindergarten Education
- Principles of Learning and Teaching: Early Childhood
- Principles of Learning and Teaching: Grades K-6
- Principles of Learning and Teaching: Grades 5-9
- Principles of Learning and Teaching: Grades 7-12
- Professional School Counselor
- Psychology
- Reading Across the Curriculum: Elementary
- Reading Specialist
- Safety/Driver Education
- School Guidance and Counseling
- School Psychologist
- School Social Worker: Content Knowledge
- Social Sciences: Content Knowledge
- Social Studies: Content and Interpretation
- Social Studies: Content Knowledge
- Sociology
- Spanish: World Language
- Special Education: Core Knowledge and Applications
- Special Education: Core Knowledge and Mild to Moderate Applications
- Special Education: Core Knowledge and Severe to Profound Applications
- Special Education: Education of Deaf and Hard of Hearing Students
- Special Education: Early Childhood
- Special Education: Preschool/Early Childhood
- Special Education: Teaching Speech to Students with Language Impairments
- Special Education: Teaching Students w/ Behavioral Disorders/Emotional Disturbances
- Special Education: Teaching Students w/ Learning Disabilities
- Special Education: Teaching Students w/ Mental Retardation
- Special Education: Teaching Students w/ Visual Impairments
- Speech Communication: Content Knowledge
- Speech-Language Pathology
- Teaching Foundations: English
- Teaching Foundations: Mathematics
- Teaching Foundations: Multiple Subjects
- Teaching Foundations: Science
- Teaching Reading
- Teaching Reading: Elementary Education
- Technology Education
- Vocational General Knowledge
- World and U.S. History: Content Knowledge
- World Languages Pedagogy

== Individual states that use the Praxis II ==
- Alabama
- Alaska
- Arkansas
- Colorado
- Connecticut
- Delaware
- District of Columbia
- Georgia
- Guam
- Hawaii
- Idaho
- Indiana
- Iowa
- Kansas
- Kentucky
- Louisiana
- Maryland
- Maine
- Mississippi
- Missouri
- Nebraska
- New Jersey
- New Hampshire
- Nevada
- North Carolina
- North Dakota
- Northern Mariana Islands
- Ohio
- Pennsylvania
- Rhode Island
- South Carolina
- South Dakota
- Tennessee
- Utah
- US Virgin Islands
- Vermont
- Virginia
- West Virginia
- Wisconsin
- Wyoming

== Teacher certification examinations in individual states ==
Examples of states that require teaching candidates to pass their state-specific tests, in lieu of the Praxis:

- Alabama (AECTP)
- Arizona (AEPA)
- California (CBEST and California Subject Examinations for Teachers, also known as CSET)
- Colorado (PLACE)
- Florida (FTCE)
- Georgia (GACE)
- Illinois (ILTS)
- Massachusetts (MTEL)
- Michigan (MTTC)
- Minnesota (MTLE)
- New Mexico (NMTA)
- New York (NYSTCE)
- Ohio (OAE)
- Oklahoma (OGET, OPTE, Subject area)
- Oregon (ORELA)
- Pennsylvania (PAPA, PECT)
- Texas (TExES)
- Virginia (RVE)
- Washington (WEST-B/WEST-E/NES)
- Wisconsin (NES)
