= Samuel Ball (educator) =

Australian psychologist (1933–2009)

- Born: 9 January 1933
- Died: 9 December 2009 (aged 76)
- Occupations: Researcher and academic

Samuel Ball (9 January 1933 – 9 December 2009) was an Australian researcher and academic in the field of education. He was employed by ETS (Educational Testing Service) in Princeton, New Jersey where he conducted research and carried out several major program evaluation studies. His work in the USA included evaluating and developing the educational content Sesame Street. In 1978 Ball returned to Australia where he held a number of positions including adjudicator for the game show Sale of the Century. During his career he authored many books.
