= K. Patricia Cross =

American educational research (1926–2023)

- Born: Kathryn Patricia Cross; March 17, 1926; Illinois, U.S.
- Died: May 8, 2023 (aged 97)

Academic background
- Education: Illinois State University (BS); University of Illinois Urbana-Champaign (MA, PhD)

Academic work
- Discipline: Education
- Sub-discipline: Higher education Academic administration
- Institutions: Cornell University; University of California, Berkeley; Harvard Graduate School of Education

Kathryn Patricia "Pat" Cross (March 17, 1926 – May 8, 2023) was an American scholar of educational research. Throughout her career, she explored adult education and higher learning, discussing methodology and pedagogy in terms of remediation and advancement in the university system.

== Early life and education ==
Born in Illinois on March 17, 1926, Cross was raised in the town of Normal. She earned her Bachelor of Science degree in mathematics from Illinois State University in 1948. She then earned an M.A. in psychology and a PhD in social psychology, both from the University of Illinois Urbana-Champaign in 1951 and 1958 respectively.

== Career ==
Cross was awarded several honorary doctorate degrees throughout her academic career. Before pursuing her education in psychology, she taught math at Harvard Community High School in Harvard, Illinois. Upon completing her PhD, Cross began a career in both administrative and academic duties. From 1959 to 1964, she was a dean of students at Cornell University; in 1964 she became the director of College and University Programs at the Educational Testing Service in Princeton, New Jersey. In 1966, she began working for the University of California, Berkeley, both as a research educator for the Center for Research and Development of Higher Education and as a research scientist and psychologist for Educational Testing Service. In 1980, she started teaching at the Harvard Graduate School of Education as a professor of education. By 1988, she had returned to Berkeley to teach as a professor of higher education, until her retirement in 1995. She held emeritus status at the University of California, Berkeley.

=== Research ===
Approaching educational research from the vantage of a mathematician and social scientist, Cross came to conclusions about student ability and experience perhaps different from those of some of her contemporaries. Though as caring for the remedial and new college student as colleagues such as Mina Shaughnessy, Cross found different reasons for these students’ underachievement. She noted that much of the discrepancies in the students' incoming test scores lies in lack of effort and motivation. Pointing out that some of these “remedial” students come from privileged backgrounds, she argued that the problem cannot be a mere matter of the school system failing to reach the underprivileged. While Cross upheld the belief that everyone should have access to higher education, she countered that remedial programs used as an effort to “catch up” the students falling behind is not the answer. Instead, she argued that institutions should point students toward excellence in areas perhaps alternative to the traditional academic curriculum of the university setting, such as vocational or semiprofessional training.

=== K. Patricia Cross Award ===
From 1996, Cross sponsored the K. Patricia Cross Future Leaders Award, recognizing graduate students demonstrating promise as future leaders in higher education. The award is currently administered by the Association of American Colleges and Universities.

== Death ==
Cross died on May 8, 2023, at the age of 97.

== Bibliography ==
- Collaborative Learning Techniques: A Handbook for College Faculty. (with Elizabeth F. Barkley and Claire Howell Major) San Francisco: Jossey-Bass, 2005.
- Classroom Research: Implementing the Scholarship of Teaching. (with Mimi Harris Steadman) San Francisco: Jossey-Bass, 1996.
- Classroom Assessment Techniques: A handbook for College Teachers, 2nd Ed. San Francisco, Jossey-Bass, 1993.
- Classroom Assessment Techniques: A Handbook for Faculty. (with Thomas A. Angelo) Ann Arbor: National University of Michigan, 1988.
- Adults as Learners. San Francisco: Jossey-Bass, 1981.
- Accent on Learning: Improving Instruction and Reshaping the Curriculum. San Francisco: Jossey-Bass, 1976.
- Planning Non-Traditional Programs: An Analysis of the Issues for Postsecondary Education. (with J.R. Valley and Associates) San Francisco: Jossey-Bass, 1974.
- Explorations in Non-Traditional Study. (With S.B. Gould, Eds.) San Francisco: Jossey-Bass, 1972.
- Beyond the Open Door: New Students to Higher Education. San Francisco: Jossey-Bass, 1971.
