= SPEAK (test) =

Standardized test measuring proficiency in spoken English

The Speaking Proficiency English Assessment Kit (SPEAK) is a test developed by the Educational Testing Service (ETS) to measure a non-native speaker's proficiency in spoken English. It is usually taken as a professional certification, especially by graduate teaching assistants and medical professionals in the American college and university system for communication with their students and patients, respectively. It is very similar to the Test of Spoken English (TSE), and is in fact a form of the TSE developed for institutions by using retired forms of the TSE.

The SPEAK has been routinely criticized for not accurately testing how a speaker will perform in the real world, in part because it is administered through the individual speaking into a recording device rather than to a person, and for using native-speaker norms to judge non-native speakers. In fact, independent audits of the SPEAK conducted in 2012 on some of the few institutions found to still administer this test revealed that the assessment standards provided by ETS were not even being used by the assessors. In fact, in some cases, the assessors of the test were not trained in any way to conduct the assessments, and were found to be assigning arbitrary grades to the candidates. Some of the raters audited were found to themselves have limited functional spoken grammar.

The SPEAK is no longer supported by the ETS, and it is not offered at most academic institutions, but some still recognize it for enrollment in certain degree programs where the proficiency of an individual's spoken English is deemed to be the priority. However, academic institutions and other agencies that would recognize this test as a valid assessment of an individual's capabilities in spoken English should be aware that this test highly susceptible to fraud. Versions of the test that may still be in use by academic institutions administering this test are compromised, and it is highly likely that people with results from this test have had the opportunity to take exactly the same test multiple times.

The ETS developed the four skills (listening, reading, speaking and writing) TOEFL iBT test. The Speaking section of the TOEFL is not available separately from the other sections, but institutions wishing to test speaking skills only may want to use the TOEIC ( of English for International Communication) Speaking Test, also developed by the ETS and available as a stand-alone assessment.
