= Seibert, Colorado =

Town in Kit Carson County, Colorado, United States

- Town
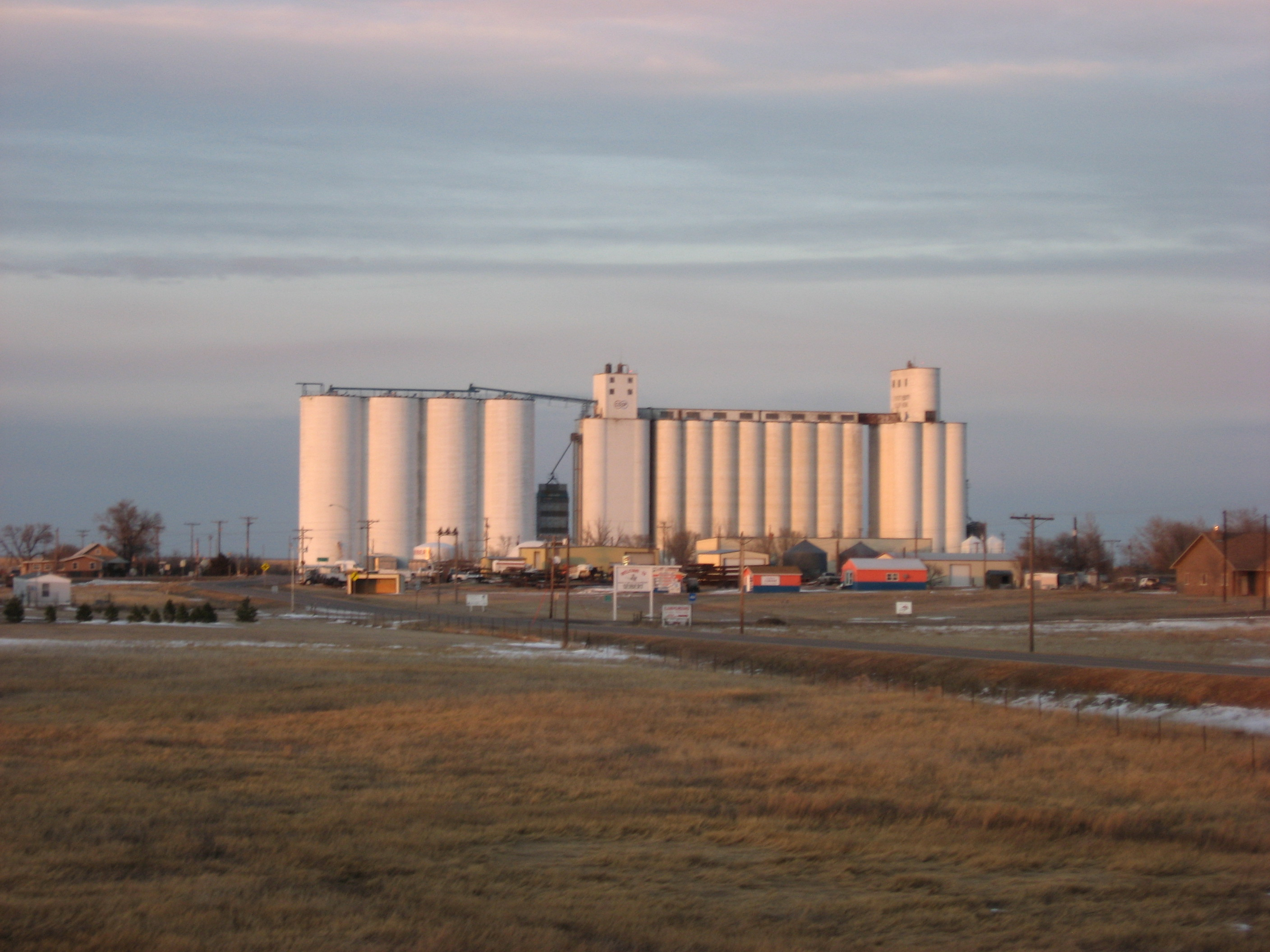
- View from the south (2009)

- Location within Kit Carson County and Colorado
- Coordinates: 39°17′58″N 102°52′13″W
- Country: United States
- State: Colorado
- County: Kit Carson
- Incorporated: June 21, 1917

Government
  - Type: Statutory Town

Area
  - Total: 0.34 sq mi (0.89 km^{2})
  - Land: 0.34 sq mi (0.89 km^{2})
  - Water: 0 sq mi (0.00 km^{2})
- Elevation: 4,712 ft (1,436 m)

Population (2020)
  - Total: 172
  - Density: 500/sq mi (190/km^{2})
- Time zone: UTC−7 (MST)
  - Summer (DST): UTC−6 (MDT)
- ZIP Code: 80834
- Area code: 970
- FIPS code: 08-69040
- GNIS ID: 2413270

Seibert is a statutory town in Kit Carson County, Colorado, United States. The population was 172 at the 2020 census.

== History ==
A post office called Seibert has been in operation since 1888. The community was named after Henry Seibert, a railroad agent.

== Geography ==
According to the United States Census Bureau, the town has a total area of 0.3 square miles (0.78 km^{2}), all of it land.

=== Climate ===
Climate data for Seibert, Colorado, 1991–2020 normals, extremes 2004–2022
Month	Jan	Feb	Mar	Apr	May	Jun	Jul	Aug	Sep	Oct	Nov	Dec	Year
Record high °F (°C)	76 (24)	80 (27)	83 (28)	88 (31)	93 (34)	107 (42)	105 (41)	100 (38)	97 (36)	90 (32)	80 (27)	73 (23)	107 (42)
Mean maximum °F (°C)	66.3 (19.1)	66.5 (19.2)	76.5 (24.7)	82.9 (28.3)	88.9 (31.6)	98.1 (36.7)	98.9 (37.2)	96.5 (35.8)	93.3 (34.1)	84.9 (29.4)	75.0 (23.9)	66.3 (19.1)	100.0 (37.8)
Mean daily maximum °F (°C)	42.5 (5.8)	44.8 (7.1)	55.0 (12.8)	62.5 (16.9)	71.4 (21.9)	83.0 (28.3)	89.1 (31.7)	85.0 (29.4)	78.4 (25.8)	65.0 (18.3)	51.7 (10.9)	42.6 (5.9)	64.3 (17.9)
Daily mean °F (°C)	28.8 (−1.8)	30.6 (−0.8)	39.9 (4.4)	47.3 (8.5)	57.1 (13.9)	67.9 (19.9)	74.0 (23.3)	71.3 (21.8)	63.6 (17.6)	50.8 (10.4)	38.1 (3.4)	29.5 (−1.4)	49.9 (9.9)
Mean daily minimum °F (°C)	15.2 (−9.3)	16.3 (−8.7)	24.9 (−3.9)	32.1 (0.1)	42.9 (6.1)	52.8 (11.6)	59.0 (15.0)	57.5 (14.2)	48.8 (9.3)	36.6 (2.6)	24.4 (−4.2)	16.3 (−8.7)	35.6 (2.0)
Mean minimum °F (°C)	−3.3 (−19.6)	−2.1 (−18.9)	8.9 (−12.8)	19.0 (−7.2)	29.9 (−1.2)	42.8 (6.0)	50.9 (10.5)	49.6 (9.8)	35.5 (1.9)	18.9 (−7.3)	10.3 (−12.1)	−3.8 (−19.9)	−10.1 (−23.4)
Record low °F (°C)	−17 (−27)	−24 (−31)	−10 (−23)	6 (−14)	23 (−5)	36 (2)	46 (8)	45 (7)	27 (−3)	1 (−17)	−13 (−25)	−18 (−28)	−24 (−31)
Average precipitation inches (mm)	0.28 (7.1)	0.49 (12)	1.01 (26)	1.44 (37)	2.69 (68)	2.05 (52)	2.64 (67)	2.70 (69)	1.10 (28)	1.22 (31)	0.39 (9.9)	0.60 (15)	16.61 (422)
Average snowfall inches (cm)	3.8 (9.7)	4.2 (11)	5.8 (15)	4.6 (12)	0.8 (2.0)	0.0 (0.0)	0.0 (0.0)	0.0 (0.0)	0.0 (0.0)	2.1 (5.3)	2.4 (6.1)	5.9 (15)	29.6 (76.1)
Average precipitation days (≥ 0.01 in)	2.9	3.0	3.9	5.2	8.0	5.0	7.4	7.2	4.4	4.2	2.8	3.5	57.5
Average snowy days (≥ 0.1 in)	2.6	2.5	2.6	2.0	0.2	0.0	0.0	0.0	0.0	0.7	2.0	3.2	15.8
Source 1: NOAA
Source 2: National Weather Service (mean maxima/minima 2006–2020)

== Demographics ==
Historical population
Census	Pop.	Note	%±
1920	311		—
1930	273		−12.2%
1940	249		−8.8%
1950	346		39.0%
1960	210		−39.3%
1970	192		−8.6%
1980	180		−6.2%
1990	181		0.6%
2000	180		−0.6%
2010	181		0.6%
2020	172		−5.0%
U.S. Decennial Census

== Notable people ==
- Norman O. Frederiksen (1909-1998), research psychologist
- Bill Pierce (1909-1981), football player
- Wilbur White (1912-1968), football player

== See also ==
- List of municipalities in Colorado
