= Dewey Stuit =

- Born: January 24, 1909; Garden Plain Township, Whiteside County, Illinois, U.S.
- Died: January 9, 2008 (aged 98); Iowa City, Iowa, U.S.
- Education: University of Illinois
- Occupations: Educational psychologist, academic administrator
- Known for: Dean of the University of Iowa's College of Arts (1949-1977)
- Spouse: Velma Elizabeth Pottorf
- Parent(s): Bernie Stuit; Grace Temple

Dewey Stuit (pronounced stew-it, January 24, 1909 - January 9, 2008) was an American educational psychologist and academic administrator. He was the dean of the College of Arts at the University of Iowa from 1948 to 1977.

== Early life ==
Stuit was born on January 24, 1909. He graduated from the University of Illinois, where he earned a bachelor's degree in 1931, a master's degree in 1932, and a PhD in educational psychology 1934.

== Career ==
Stuit began his career at Carleton College.

Stuit joined the department of Psychology at the University of Iowa. He co-authored two books of educational psychology. When students first took the Graduate Record Examinations (GRE) as an experiment for the Carnegie Foundation for the Advancement of Teaching in 1940, Stuit analyzed the results for further development. He served as the dean of the College of Arts at the University of Iowa from 1948 to 1977.

== Personal life and death ==
Stuit married Velma Elizabeth Pottorf in 1934.

Stuit died on January 9, 2008, in Iowa City. He bequeathed $3.2 million to the University of Iowa upon his death. He is the namesake of the Dewey Stuit Fund for Undergraduate Research at Iowa.
