= Paul Dressel =

American educational psychologist

- Born: November 29, 1910
- Died: November 22, 1989 (aged 78)
- Education: Wittenberg University; Michigan State University; University of Michigan
- Occupation: Educational psychologist
- Employer: Michigan State University
- Spouse: Wilma Frances Sackett
- Children: 3 daughters

Paul Leroy Dressel (November 29, 1910 – November 22, 1989) was an American educational psychologist. He was the founding director of the Counseling Center at Michigan State University, and the author of several books.

== Early life ==
Dressel was born on November 29, 1910. He graduated from Wittenberg University, where he earned a bachelor's degree in 1931. He earned a master's degree from Michigan State University in 1934, and a PhD from the University of Michigan in 1939.

== Career ==
Dressel began his career as a statistician. He joined Michigan State University as the chairman of its board of examiners. When MSU students first took the Graduate Record Examinations as an experiment for the Carnegie Foundation for the Advancement of Teaching in 1943, it was Dressel who analyzed the results.

Dressel founded MSU's Counseling Center for returning veterans of World War II, and he served as its director until 1981. He was also the director of the Office of Institutional Research from 1959 to 1961, and the Assistant Provost from 1961 to 1964.

Dressel was the author of several books, including College To University: The Hannah Years at Michigan State, 1935-1969.

== Personal life and death ==
Dressel married Wilma Frances Sackett. They had three daughters. He died on November 22, 1989, at 78.
