= Norman O. Frederiksen =

American research psychologist

- Born: February 9, 1909; Seibert, Colorado, U.S.
- Died: 1998 (aged 88–89); Princeton, New Jersey, U.S.
- Occupation: Research Psychologist
- Writing career
- Period: 1930s–1990s
- Notable works: The In-Basket Test; The Real Test Bias: Influences of Testing on Teaching and Learning
- Notable awards: American Psychological Association Award for Distinguished Contributions to Knowledge, 1984

Norman “Fritz” Frederiksen (1909-1998) was an American research psychologist and leading proponent of performance assessment, an approach to educational and occupational testing that focused on the use of tasks similar to the ones individuals actually encounter in real classroom and work environments. In keeping with the philosophy underlying this approach, Frederiksen was a critic of multiple-choice testing, which he felt negatively influenced school curricula and classroom practice. Much of his research centred upon creating and evaluating alternative approaches to the measurement of knowledge and skill, which he pursued over a 40-year career at Educational Testing Service (ETS) in Princeton, NJ. For his work, he received the American Psychological Association's Award for Distinguished Contributions to Knowledge in 1984 and, by the time of his retirement from ETS, had attained the position of Distinguished Scientist, the organization's highest-ranking scientific title at that time.

== Early years ==
Norman Frederiksen was born on February 9, 1909, on a farm near Seibert, Colorado, and grew up in Fairbury, Nebraska, to which his family had moved. He attended Nebraska Wesleyan University from 1927 to 1931, graduating with an AB degree in psychology. He moved to the University of Nebraska in 1931 to accept an assistantship and pursue a master's degree. At Nebraska, he studied under, and published with, J. P. Guilford, who was later to be widely recognized for his multi-faceted theory of human abilities. Upon completion of his master's, Frederiksen moved to Syracuse University to study under Floyd Allport, with whom he also published and who is today considered the founder of social psychology. Upon graduation, Frederiksen left Syracuse in the fall of 1937 to join the faculty of Princeton University.

== Career ==
At Princeton University, Frederiksen met Harold Gulliksen, a professor and pioneering psychometrician, under whom he worked during war-time leave on a project concerning the selection and training of naval personnel (1942–1947). Frederiksen began his association with ETS, where Gulliksen also was affiliated, soon after the naval project ended, authoring the second research report released by the fledgling testing organization. He remained on the faculty of Princeton University, however, until 1955, rising to the rank of associate professor.

At ETS, Frederiksen’s research centered on assessment innovation, in particular on devising ways to measure complex problem solving in education and in occupational settings, often through the use of "constructed-response" (i.e., free response) and performance tasks. The approach he took to test design and validation was grounded in theory, particularly in trying to understand the cognitive processes brought to bear in real-world problem-solving and how to measure those processes in test situations.

Frederiksen's work on performance assessment included co-authoring an early chapter on its use in education in the first edition of Educational Measurement, edited by E. F. Linquist, and published in 1951. He invented the “in-basket test,” which he described in a book of that title, published by the American Psychological Association in 1957. The test presented the examinee with a collection of memos, mail, telephone messages, and the like, which needed to be prioritized and acted upon. Today, the in-basket test is used throughout the world to assess applicants for managerial jobs in a wide variety of industries.

Frederiksen also applied his innovative techniques to the measurement of creativity, for which he developed the Formulating Hypotheses test. Each item in the test presented a description of a situation and asked the examinee to generate as many causes for that situation as he or she could. In a series of research studies using the test, Frederiksen and his colleagues demonstrated that this open-ended technique was able to measure divergent thinking skills that were considerably different from the convergent ones tapped by multiple-choice versions of the test.

Frederiksen’s work in the measurement of problem solving and creativity led to his publication in 1984 of a now-classic article, “The Real Test Bias: Influences of Testing on Teaching and Learning.” The article’s thesis was that multiple-choice formats measured only a subset of the skills important for success in educational environments and that the heavy dependence in educational testing on that format had a narrowing effect on classroom instruction. That theoretical position motivated much of his research and it is one that continues to motivate research and development throughout the field of educational testing today.

Frederiksen was president of the American Psychological Association's (APA) Division of Evaluation, Measurement, and Statistics from 1970 to 1971. He died in Princeton, NJ in 1998.

In 2010, the ETS board of trustees created the Norman O. Frederiksen Chair in Assessment Innovation. The resolution establishing the chair called for it to be filled by "a highly accomplished researcher and scholar whose work builds on and expands the academic and intellectual traditions exemplified by the achievements of Dr. Norman O. Frederiksen." The first and current holder of the chair is Randy E. Bennett.
