= Graduate Record Examinations =

Standardized tests

Record Examination: General Test
- Logo used since 2024
- Acronym: GRE
- Type: Computer-based or paper-based standardized test
- Administrator: Educational Testing Service
- Skills tested: Analytical writing, quantitative reasoning and verbal reasoning.
- Purpose: Admissions to master's and doctoral degree programs in various universities
- Year started: 1936; 90 years ago
- Duration: 1 hour and 58 minutes
- Score range: Analytical writing: 0.0 to 6.0 (in 0.5-point increments), Verbal reasoning: 130 to 170 (in 1-point increments), Quantitative reasoning: 130 to 170 (in 1-point increments).
- Score validity: 5 years
- Offered: Computer-based test: Multiple times a year (depends on availability of the test center); Paper-based test: Up to 3 times a year in October, November and February
- Restrictions on attempts: Computer-based test: Can be taken only once after 21 days from the day of exam in every year. Maximum of 5 times a year. (Applies even if candidate cancels scores on a test taken previously.); Paper-based test: Can be taken as often as it is offered.
- Regions: About 1,000 test centers in more than 160 countries
- Languages: English
- Annual number of test takers: ▼206,004 (T.Y. 2024-25)
- Prerequisites: No official prerequisite. Intended for bachelor's degree graduates and undergraduate students who are about to graduate. Fluency in English assumed.
- Fee: US$ 220 (Limited offers of "Fee Reduction Program" for U.S. citizens or resident aliens who demonstrate financial need, and for national programs in United States that work with underrepresented groups.)
- Used by: Some graduate schools in USA, and in a few other countries
- Website: www.ets.org/gre

The Graduate Record Examinations (GRE) is a standardized test that is part of the admissions process for some graduate schools in the United States and Canada. The GRE is owned and administered by the Educational Testing Service (ETS). The test was established in 1936 by the Carnegie Foundation for the Advancement of Teaching.

According to ETS, the GRE General Test aims to measure verbal reasoning, quantitative reasoning, analytical writing, and critical thinking skills that have been acquired over a long period of learning. The content of the GRE consists of certain specific data analysis or interpretation, arguments and reasoning, algebra, geometry, arithmetic, and vocabulary sections. The GRE General Test is offered as a computer-based exam administered at testing centers and institution owned or authorized by Prometric as well as at home.

In the graduate school admissions process, the level of emphasis that is placed upon GRE scores varies widely among schools and departments. The importance of a GRE score can range from being a mere admission formality to an important selection factor.

The GRE was significantly overhauled in August 2011, resulting in an exam that is adaptive on a section-by-section basis, rather than question by question, so that the performance on the first verbal and math sections determines the difficulty of the second sections presented (excluding the experimental section). Overall, the test retained the sections and many of the question types from its predecessor, but the scoring scale was changed to a 130 to 170 scale (from a 200 to 800 scale).

The cost to take the test is US$249, although ETS will reduce the fee under certain circumstances. It also provides financial aid to GRE applicants who prove economic hardship. ETS does not release scores that are older than five years, although graduate program policies on the acceptance of scores older than five years will vary.

Once almost universally required for admission to Ph.D. science programs in the U.S., its use for that purpose has fallen precipitously since 2020.

== History ==
The Graduate Record Examinations was "initiated in 1936 as a joint experiment in higher education by the graduate school deans of four Ivy League universities and the Carnegie Foundation for the Advancement of Teaching."

The first universities to experiment with the test on their students were Harvard University, Yale University, Princeton University and Columbia University. The University of Wisconsin was the first public university to ask their students to take the test in 1938. It was first given to students at the University of Iowa in 1940, where it was analyzed by psychologist Dewey Stuit. It was first taken by students at Texas Tech University in 1942. In 1943, it was taken by students at Michigan State University, where it was analyzed by Paul Dressel. It was taken by over 45,000 students applying to 500 colleges in 1948.

Until the Educational Testing Service was established in January 1948, the GRE was a project of the Carnegie Foundation.

=== Changes to exam over time ===
The earliest versions of the GRE tested only for verbal and quantitative ability. For a number of years before October 2002, the GRE had a separate Analytical Ability section which tested candidates on logical and analytical reasoning abilities. This section was replaced by the Analytical Writing Assessment.

Some changes to the GRE took effect on November 1, 2007, as ETS started to include new types of questions in the exam. The changes mostly centered on "fill in the blank" type answers for the mathematics section that requires the test-taker to fill in the blank directly, without being able to choose from a multiple choice list of answers. ETS announced plans to introduce two of these new types of questions in each quantitative section, while the majority of questions would be presented in the regular format.

Since January 2008, the Reading Comprehension within the verbal sections has been reformatted, passages' "line numbers will be replaced with highlighting when necessary in order to focus the test taker on specific information in the passage" to "help students more easily find the pertinent information in reading passages."

Before August 2011, the scale was 200–800, in 10-point increments.

=== 2011 revision ===
In December 2009, ETS announced plans to move forward with significant revisions to the GRE in 2011. Changes include a new 130–170 scoring scale, the elimination of certain question types such as antonyms and analogies, the addition of an online calculator, and the elimination of the CAT format of question-by-question adjustment, in favor of a section by section adjustment.

On August 1, 2011, the Revised GRE General test replaced General GRE test. The new types of questions in the revised format are intended to test the skills needed in graduate and business schools programs. From July 2012 onwards GRE announced an option for users to customize their scores called ScoreSelect.

=== Experimental section ===
Until 2023, there was an experimental section, which could be either verbal or quantitative, and contained new questions ETS is considering for future use. Although the experimental section did not count towards the test-taker's score, it was unidentified and appears identical to the scored sections. Because test takers had no definite way of knowing which section was experimental, it was typically advised that test takers try their best and be focused on every section. Sometimes an identified research section at the end of the test was given instead of the experimental section. There was no experimental section on the paper-based GRE.

== Structure ==
The computer-based GRE General Test consists of six sections. The first section is always the analytical writing section involving separately timed issue and argument tasks. The next five sections consist of two verbal reasoning sections, two quantitative reasoning sections, and either an experimental or research section. These five sections may occur in any order. The experimental section does not count towards the final score but is not distinguished from the scored sections.

Unlike the computer adaptive test before August 2011, the GRE General Test is a multistage test, where the examinee's performance on earlier sections determines the difficulty of subsequent sections, using a technique known as computer-adaptive testing. This format allows the examined person to freely move back and forth between questions within each section, and the testing software allows the user to "mark" questions within each section for later review if time remains. The entire testing procedure lasts about 3 hours 45 minutes. One-minute breaks are offered after each section and a 10-minute break after the third section.

The paper-based GRE General Test also consists of six sections. The analytical writing is split up into two sections, one section for each issue and argument task. The next four sections consist of two verbal and two quantitative sections in varying order. There is no experimental section on the paper-based test.

=== Analytical writing section ===
The analytical writing section consists of two different essays, an "issue task" and an "argument task". The writing section is graded on a scale of 0–6, in half-point increments. The essays are written on a computer using a word processing program specifically designed by ETS. The program allows only basic computer functions and does not contain a spell-checker or other advanced features. Each essay is scored by at least two readers on a six-point holist scale. If the two scores are within one point, the average of the scores is taken. If the two scores differ by more than a point, a third reader examines the response.

==== Issue Task ====
The test taker is given 30 minutes to write an essay about a selected topic. Issue topics are selected from a pool of questions, which the GRE Program has published in its entirety. Individuals preparing for the GRE may access the pool of tasks on the ETS website.

==== Argument Task ====
The test taker will be given an argument (i.e. a series of facts and considerations leading to a conclusion) and asked to write an essay that critiques the argument. Test takers are asked to consider the argument's logic and to make suggestions about how to improve the logic of the argument. Test takers are expected to address the logical flaws of the argument and not provide a personal opinion on the subject. The time allotted for this essay is 30 minutes. The Arguments are selected from a pool of topics, which the GRE Program has published in its entirety. Individuals preparing for the GRE may access the pool of tasks on the ETS website. This task is already cancelled since September 22, 2023.

=== Verbal section ===
The computer-based verbal sections assess reading comprehension, critical reasoning, and vocabulary usage. The verbal test is scored on a scale of 130–170, in 1-point increments. In a typical examination, each verbal section consists of 20 questions to be completed in 30 minutes. Each verbal section consists of about 6 text completion, 4 sentence equivalence, and 10 critical reading questions. The changes in 2011 include a reduced emphasis on rote vocabulary knowledge and the elimination of antonyms and analogies. Text completion items have replaced sentence completions and new reading question types allowing for the selection of multiple answers were added.

=== Quantitative section ===
The computer-based quantitative sections assess knowledge and reasoning skills taught in most Mathematics and Statistics courses in secondary schools. The quantitative test is scored on a scale of 130–170, in 1-point increments. In a typical examination, each quantitative section consists of 20 questions to be completed in 35 minutes. Each quantitative section consists of about 8 quantitative comparisons, 9 problem solving items, and 3 data interpretation questions. The changes in 2011 include the addition of numeric entry items requiring the examinee to fill in the blank and multiple-choice items requiring the examinee to select multiple correct responses.

- Arithmetic:
  - Integer, Divisibility rule, Integer factorization, Prime number, Remainder, Parity
  - Exponentiation, nth root
  - Estimation, Percentage, Ratio, Rate, Absolute value, Number line, Decimal representation, Sequence
- Algebra:
  - Operation
  - Factorization, Expression
  - Relation, Function, Equation, Inequality
  - Equation solving, Linear equation, Quadratic equation
  - System of linear equations
  - Analytic geometry, Graph of a function, Zero of a function, Y-intercept, Slope
- Geometry:
  - Parallel, Perpendicular
  - Circle
  - Triangle, Isosceles triangle, Equilateral triangle, Special right triangle
  - Quadrilateral, Polygon
  - Congruence, Similarity
  - Polyhedron
  - Area, Perimeter, Volume
  - Pythagorean theorem
  - Angle, Degree
- Data analysis:
  - Statistics, Mean, Median, Mode, Range, Standard deviation, Interquartile range, Quartile, Percentile
  - Line chart, Bar chart, Pie chart, Box plot, Scatter plot, Frequency
  - Probability, Independence
  - Conditional probability
  - Random variable, Probability distribution, Normal distribution
  - Counting method, Combination, Permutation, Venn diagram

== Scoring ==
An examinee can miss one or more questions on a multiple-choice section and still receive a perfect score of 170. Likewise, even if no question is answered correctly, 130 is the lowest possible score. Verbal and quantitative reasoning scores are given in one-point increments, and analytical writing scores are given in half-point increments on a scale of 0 to 6.

=== Scaled score percentiles ===
The percentiles for the current General test and the concordance with the prior format are as follows. According to interpretive data published by ETS, from July 1, 2015 to June 30, 2018 about 2 million people have taken the test. The mean and standard deviation of the verbal section are 150.24 and 8.44, respectively. The quantitative section has a mean of 153.07 with a standard deviation of 9.24. Analytical writing has a mean of 3.55 with a standard deviation of 0.86.

| Scaled score | Verbal reasoning percentile | Verbal prior scale | Quantitative reasoning percentile | Quantitative prior scale |
|---|---|---|---|---|
| 170 | 99 | 760–800 | 96 | 800 |
| 169 | 99 | 740–750 | 94 | 800 |
| 168 | 98 | 720–730 | 92 | 800 |
| 167 | 98 | 710 | 89 | 800 |
| 166 | 97 | 700 | 87 | 800 |
| 165 | 96 | 680–690 | 85 | 790 |
| 164 | 94 | 660–670 | 83 | 790 |
| 163 | 92 | 650 | 80 | 780 |
| 162 | 90 | 630–640 | 78 | 770 |
| 161 | 88 | 620 | 75 | 770 |
| 160 | 85 | 600–610 | 72 | 760 |
| 159 | 82 | 590 | 69 | 750 |
| 158 | 79 | 570–580 | 65 | 740 |
| 157 | 75 | 560 | 62 | 730 |
| 156 | 72 | 540–550 | 59 | 720 |
| 155 | 67 | 530 | 55 | 700–710 |
| 154 | 63 | 510–520 | 51 | 690 |
| 153 | 59 | 500 | 48 | 680 |
| 152 | 53 | 480–490 | 44 | 660–670 |
| 151 | 50 | 460–470 | 40 | 640–650 |
| 150 | 45 | 450 | 36 | 630 |
| 149 | 40 | 430–440 | 33 | 610–620 |
| 148 | 36 | 420 | 29 | 590–600 |
| 147 | 32 | 410 | 25 | 570–580 |
| 146 | 28 | 390–400 | 22 | 550–560 |
| 145 | 25 | 380 | 18 | 530–540 |
| 144 | 22 | 370 | 15 | 500–520 |
| 143 | 19 | 350–360 | 13 | 480–490 |
| 142 | 16 | 340 | 11 | 460–470 |
| 141 | 14 | 330 | 9 | 430–450 |
| 140 | 11 | 320 | 7 | 400–420 |
| 139 | 9 | 310 | 6 | 380–390 |
| 138 | 8 | 300 | 4 | 350–370 |
| 137 | 6 | 290 | 3 | 330–340 |
| 136 | 5 | 280 | 3 | 300–320 |
| 135 | 4 | 280 | 2 | 280–290 |
| 134 | 3 | 270 | 1 | 260–270 |
| 133 | 2 | 260 | 1 | 240–250 |
| 132 | 2 | 250 | <1 | 220–230 |
| 131 | 1 | 240 | <1 | 200–210 |
| 130 | <1 | 200–230 | <1 | 200 |

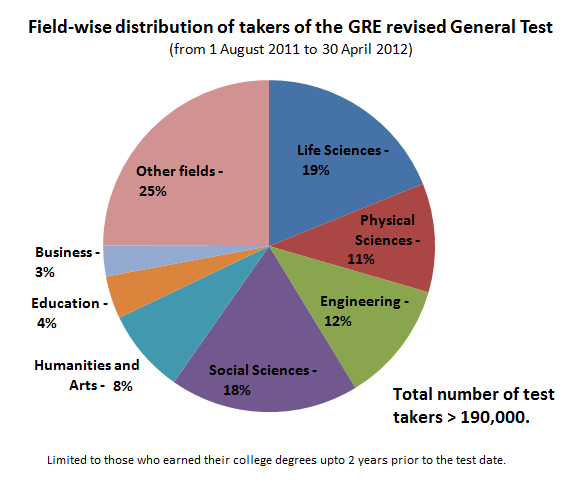
Field-wise distribution of takers of GRE revised General Test

| Analytical Writing score | Writing % Below |
|---|---|
| 6 | 99 |
| 5.5 | 98 |
| 5 | 92 |
| 4.5 | 81 |
| 4 | 57 |
| 3.5 | 39 |
| 3 | 15 |
| 2.5 | 7 |
| 2 | 2 |
| 1.5 | 1 |
| 1 | <1 |
| 0.5 | <1 |

"Field-wise distribution" of test takers is "limited to those who earned their college degrees up to two years before the test date." ETS provides no score data for "non-traditional" students who have been out of school more than two years, although its own report "RR-99-16" indicated that 22% of all test takers in 1996 were over the age of 30.

== GRE Subject Tests ==
In addition to the General Test, there are also three GRE Subject Tests testing knowledge in the specific areas of Mathematics, Physics, and Psychology. The length of each exam is 170 minutes.

In the past, subject tests were also offered in the areas of Computer Science, Economics, Revised Education, Engineering, English Literature, French, Geography, Geology, German, History, Music, Political Science, Sociology, Spanish, and Biochemistry, Cell and Molecular Biology. In April 1998, the Revised Education and Political Science exams were discontinued. In April 2000, the History and Sociology exams were discontinued; with Economics, Engineering, Music, and Geology being discontinued in April 2001. The Computer Science exam was discontinued after April 2013. Biochemistry, Cell and Molecular Biology was discontinued in December 2016. The GRE Biology Test and GRE Literature in English Test tests were discontinued in May 2021. The GRE Chemistry Test was discontinued in May 2023.

== Use in admissions ==
Some graduate schools in the United States require GRE results as part of the admissions process. The GRE is a standardized test intended to measure all graduates' abilities in tasks of general academic nature, regardless of their fields of specialization, and the extent to which undergraduate education has developed their verbal skills, quantitative skills, and abstract thinking.

In addition to GRE scores, admission to graduate schools depends on several other factors, such as GPA, letters of recommendation, and statements of purpose. Furthermore, unlike other standardized admissions tests (such as the SAT, LSAT, and MCAT), the use and weight of GRE scores vary considerably not only from school to school, but also from department to department and program to program. For instance, most business schools and economics programs require very high GRE or GMAT scores for entry, while engineering programs are known to allow more score variation. Liberal arts programs may only consider the applicant's verbal score, while mathematics and science programs may only consider quantitative ability. Some schools use the GRE in admissions decisions, but not in funding decisions; others use it for selection of scholarship and fellowship candidates, but not for admissions. In some cases, the GRE may be a general requirement for graduate admissions imposed by the university, while particular departments may not consider the scores at all. Graduate schools will typically provide the average scores of previously admitted students and information about how the GRE is considered in admissions and funding decisions. In some cases, programs have hard cut off requirements for the GRE; for example, the Yale Economics PhD program requires a minimum quantitative score of 160 to apply. The best way to ascertain how a particular school or program evaluates a GRE score in the admissions process is to contact the person in charge of graduate admissions for the specific program in question.

After a trial cycle of GRE–free admissions for Fall 2021, University of California, Berkeley voted to drop the GRE requirement for most graduate program admissions for Fall 2022 as well. University of Michigan, Ann Arbor shortly followed announcing that they would drop the GRE requirements for Ph.D. admissions beginning with the 2022–23 admissions cycle. By late 2022, the trend had intensified.

=== Law school ===
In February 2016, the University of Arizona James E. Rogers College of Law became the first law school to accept either the GRE or the Law School Admissions Test (LSAT) from all applicants. The college made the decision after conducting a study showing that the GRE is a valid and reliable predictor of students' first-term law school grades.

In the spring of 2017, Harvard Law School announced it was joining University of Arizona Law in accepting the GRE in addition to the LSAT from applicants to its three-year J.D. program.

Since 2022, more than 100 of the 198 American Bar Association approved law schools accepted the GRE instead of the LSAT.

=== MBA ===
GRE score can be used for taking admission in MBA in foreign colleges.

The GMAT (Graduate Management Admission Test) is a computer-adaptive standardized test in mathematics and the English language for measuring aptitude to succeed academically in graduate business studies. Business schools commonly use the test as one of many selection criteria for admission into an MBA program. Starting in 2009, many business schools began accepting the GRE in lieu of a GMAT score. Policies varied widely for several years. However, as of the 2014–2015 admissions season, most business schools accept both tests equally. Either a GMAT score or a GRE score can be submitted for an application to an MBA program. Business schools also accept either score for their other (non-MBA) Masters and Ph.D. programs.

The primary issue on which business school test acceptance policies vary is in how old a GRE or GMAT score can be before it is no longer accepted. The standard is that scores cannot be more than 5 years old (e.g., Wharton, MIT Sloan, Columbia Business School).

=== Intellectual clubs ===
High GRE scores are accepted as qualifying evidence to some intellectual clubs such as Intertel and the Triple Nine Society, the minimum passing score depending on the selectivity of the society and the time period when the test was taken. Intertel accepts scores in the 99th percentile obtained after 2011. Mensa does not accept any GRE score after September 2001.

== Preparation ==
A variety of resources are available for those wishing to prepare for the GRE. ETS provides preparation software called PowerPrep, which contains two practice tests of retired questions, as well as further practice questions and review material. Since the software replicates both the test format and the questions used, it can be useful to predict the actual GRE scores. ETS does not license their past questions to any other company, making them the only source for official retired material. ETS used to publish the "BIG BOOK" which contained a number of actual GRE questions; however, this publishing was abandoned. Several companies provide courses, books, and other unofficial preparation materials.

Some students taking the GRE use a test preparation company. Students who do not use these courses often rely on material from university text books, GRE preparation books, sample tests, and free web resources.

== Testing locations ==
While the general and subject tests are held at many undergraduate institutions, the computer-based general test can be held in over 1,000 locations with appropriate technological accommodations. In the United States, students in major cities or from large universities will usually find a nearby test center, while those in more isolated areas may have to travel a few hours to an urban or university location. Many industrialized countries also have test centers, but at times test-takers must cross country borders.

== Criticism ==
=== Bias ===
==== Algorithmic bias ====
Critics have claimed that the computer-adaptive methodology may discourage some test takers since the question difficulty changes with performance. For example, if the test-taker is presented with remarkably easy questions halfway into the exam, they may infer that they are not performing well, which will influence their abilities as the exam continues, even though question difficulty is subjective. By contrast, standard testing methods may discourage students by giving them more difficult items earlier on.

Critics have also stated that the computer-adaptive method of placing more weight on the first several questions is biased against test takers who typically perform poorly at the beginning of a test due to stress or confusion before becoming more comfortable as the exam continues. On the other hand, standard fixed-form tests could equally be said to be "biased" against students with less testing stamina since they would need to be approximately twice the length of an equivalent computer adaptive test to obtain a similar level of precision.

==== Implicit bias ====
The GRE has also been subjected to the same racial bias criticisms that have been lodged against other admissions tests. In 1998, The Journal of Blacks in Higher Education noted that the mean score for black test-takers in 1996 was 389 on the verbal section, 409 on the quantitative section, and 423 on the analytic, while white test-takers averaged 496, 538, and 564, respectively. The National Association of Test Directors Symposia in 2004 stated a belief that simple mean score differences may not constitute evidence of bias unless the populations are known to be equal in ability. A more effective, accepted, and empirical approach is the analysis of differential test functioning, which examines the differences in item response theory curves for subgroups; the best approach for this is the DFIT framework.

=== Weak indicator of graduate school performance ===
The GREs are criticized for not being a true measure of whether a student will be successful in graduate school. Robert Sternberg (now of Cornell University, but working at Yale University at the time of the study), a long-time critic of modern intelligence testing in general, found the GRE general test was weakly predictive of success in graduate studies in psychology. The strongest relationship was found for the now-defunct analytical portion of the exam.

The ETS published a report ("What is the Value of the GRE?") that points out the predictive value of the GRE on a student's index of success at the graduate level. The problem with earlier studies is the statistical phenomenon of restriction of range. A correlation coefficient is sensitive to the range sampled for the test. Specifically, if only students accepted to graduate programs are studied (in Sternberg & Williams and other research), the relationship is occluded. Validity coefficients range from .30 to .45 between the GRE and both first year and overall graduate GPA in ETS' study.

Kaplan and Saccuzzo state that the criterion that the GRE best predicts is first-year grades in graduate school. However, this correlation is only in the high tens to low twenties. "If the test correlates with a criterion at the .4 level, then it accounts for 16% of the variability in that criterion, with the other 84% resulting from unknown factors and errors" (p. 303). Graduate schools may be placing too much importance on standardized tests rather than on factors that more fully account for graduate school success, such as a thesis-requiring Honours degree, prior research experience, GPAs, or work experience. While graduate schools do consider these areas, many times schools will not consider applicants that score below a current score of roughly 314 (1301 prior score). Kaplan and Saccuzzo also state that "the GRE predict[s] neither clinical skill nor even the ability to solve real-world problems" (p. 303).

In 2007, a study by a university found a correlation of .30 to .45 between the GRE and both first year and overall graduate GPA. The correlation between GRE score and graduate school completion rates ranged from .11 (for the now defunct analytical section) to .39 (for the GRE subject test). Correlations with faculty ratings ranged from .35 to .50.

=== Historical susceptibility to cheating ===
In May 1994, Kaplan, Inc warned ETS, in hearings before a New York legislative committee, that the small question pool available to the computer-adaptive test made it vulnerable to cheating. ETS assured investigators that it was using multiple sets of questions and that the test was secure. This was later discovered to be incorrect.

In December 1994, prompted by student reports of recycled questions, then Director of GRE Programs for Kaplan, Inc and current CEO of Knewton, Jose Ferreira, led a team of 22 staff members deployed to 9 U.S. cities to take the exam. Kaplan, Inc then presented ETS with 150 questions, representing 70–80% of the GRE. According to early news releases, ETS appeared grateful to Stanley H. Kaplan, Inc. for identifying the security problem. However, on December 31, ETS sued Kaplan, Inc. for violation of a federal electronic communications privacy act, copyright laws, breach of contract, fraud, and a confidentiality agreement signed by test-takers on test day. On January 2, 1995, an agreement was reached out of court.

Additionally, in 1994, the scoring algorithm for the computer-adaptive form of the GRE was discovered to be insecure. ETS acknowledged that Kaplan, Inc employees, led by Jose Ferreira, reverse-engineered key features of the GRE scoring algorithms. The researchers found that a test taker's performance on the first few questions of the exam had a disproportionate effect on the test taker's final score. To preserve the integrity of scores, ETS adopted a more sophisticated scoring algorithm.

== See also ==
- List of admissions tests

GRE Subject Tests:

- GRE Mathematics Test
- GRE Physics Test
- GRE Psychology Test

Discontinued GRE Subject Tests:

- GRE Biochemistry, Cell and Molecular Biology Test discontinued December 2016
- GRE Biology Test discontinued May 2021
- GRE Chemistry Test discontinued May 2023
- GRE Economics Test discontinued April 2001
- GRE Literature in English Test discontinued May 2021

Other tests:

- ACT
- Graduate Management Admission Test (GMAT)
- Graduate Aptitude Test in Engineering (GATE)
- International English Language Testing System (IELTS)
- Law School Admission Test (LSAT)
- Medical College Admission Test (MCAT)
- SAT
- Test of English as a Foreign Language (TOEFL)
