= ETS Europe =

ETS Europe is the European arm of Educational Testing Service, an American company, involved in scholastic assessment in Europe.

== History ==
It is headquartered in Utrecht in the Netherlands. ETS employs about 2,700 individuals, including 240 with doctorates and an additional 350 others with "higher degrees." Work that ETS does that is not associated with its nonprofit educational research mission is conducted by for-profit subsidiaries, such as Prometric, which administers test by computer for licensing and certification in the professional world, and ETS Global BV, which contains much of the international operations of the company.

About 25% of the work carried out by ETS is contracted by the private, not-for-profit firm, the College Board. The most popular of the College Board's tests is the SAT, taken by more than 3 million students annually. ETS also develops and administers The College Board's Advanced Placement program, which is widely used in US high schools for advanced course credit.

== England and Wales Controversy ==
In England and Wales ETS Europe were contracted to operate the National Curriculum assessments on behalf of the government. ETS took over this role from Edexcel in 2008. The first year of their operation was struck by a number of problems, including the late arrival of scripts to examiners, a database of student entries being unavailable, and countrywide reports of problems with the marking of the papers. The opposition Conservative party has criticised the awarding of the contracts to ETS, and produced a dossier listing previous problems with ETS' service. Their contract with the QCA was terminated in August 2008: ETS is to pay back £19.5m and cancel invoices worth £4.6m. The UK government asked Lord Sutherland to conduct an inquiry into the failure of the 2008 tests. The report included in its main findings:

- Primary responsibility for this summer's delivery failure rests with ETS Global BV, which won the public contract to deliver the tests
- ETS's capacity to deliver the contract proved to be insufficient. A lack of comprehensive planning and testing by ETS of its systems and processes was a key factor in the delivery failure.
