= Florida Teacher Certification Examinations =

Florida Teacher Certification Examinations (FTCE) are standardized tests used to assess the competencies of prospective teachers according to Florida's Sunshine State Standards. FTCE refers to 47 different exams: four General Knowledge sub-tests, one Professional Education exam, and 42 Subject Area examinations.

Passing the appropriate FTCE exam is considered one part of the requirements for becoming a licensed teacher in Florida. Prospective teachers go through the Bureau of Educator Certification at the Department of Education to become certified. The Bureau advises that teacher candidates should submit an application for certification before applying to take certification examinations. Note: All teachers must have either professional or temporary certification by the Bureau of Educator Certification.

Paper and pencil tests are offered 6 times per Calendar Year, with 2 additional supplemental administrations. Supplemental administrations cost considerably more than regular testing dates. As an alternative to paper-and-pencil tests, many tests are now offered on the computer during the week at 36 locations throughout the state. The computer-based tests are equivalent to the paper-and-pencil tests in length and difficulty.

== History ==
The federal No Child Left Behind Act of 2001 (NCLB) requires that, in order for states to receive federal funding, all teachers must be "highly qualified" as defined in the law by the end of the 2006-07 school year. The Florida Department of Education has defined a highly qualified teacher to be one who has (1) fulfilled the state's certification and licensing requirements, (2) obtained at least a bachelor's degree, and (3) demonstrated subject matter expertise. The procedure for demonstrating subject matter knowledge depends on a teacher's tenure and level of instruction.

As a result, the FTCE began in 2002 to replace the College Level Academic Skills Test (CLAST). The test satisfies Florida Statutes 1012.56.2 (g), (h), and (i) to be certified as a teacher. The specific implementation is according to the Florida Administrative Code 6A-4.0021

== FTCE General Knowledge test ==
The general knowledge test is meant to test general education. There are four parts: English Language Skills, Readings, mathematics, and an Essay.

=== English Language ===
Percent correct needed to pass on the easiest version: 73%

Time allotted: 40 minutes

==== Competencies Covered ====
- Conceptual and organizational
- Word choice
- Sentence structure
- Grammar
- Spelling
- Capitalization
- Punctuation

==== Essay ====
Time allotted: 50 minutes

==== Competencies Covered ====
- Purpose
- Statement of main idea
- Organization of ideas and details
- Provide adequate, relevant supporting material
- Use of transitions
- Command of Language
- Avoidance of inappropriate slang, jargon, and clichés
- Variety of sentence patterns
- Consistent point of view
- Conventions of standard American English

==== Mathematics ====
A 4 function calculator is provided for this portion of the test.

Percent correct needed to pass on the easiest version: 60%

Time allotted: 100 minutes

==== Competencies Covered ====
- Number sense, concepts, and operations
- Measurement
- Geometry
- Spatial sense
- Algebraic thinking
- Data analysis
- Probability

==== Reference Sheet ====
The reference sheet provided includes:

- Area of a rectangle, parallelogram, trapezoid, and triangle
- Area and circumference of a circle
- Volume and surface area of a pyramid, prism, cone, cylinder, and sphere
- The Pythagorean Theorem
- Distance, midpoint, and slope formulas
- A simple interest formula
- Conversions between metric and standard units
- a decimal (3.14) and fractional (22/7) approximation of pi

==== Reading ====
Percent correct needed to pass on the easiest version: 73% Time allotted: 40 minutes

==== Competencies Covered ====
- Literal comprehension
- Inferential comprehension

== FTCE Profession Education test ==
The profession education test is meant to test education specific to pedagogy and professional practices.

Percent correct needed to pass on the easiest version: 73%

Time allotted: 150 minutes

=== Competencies Covered ===
- Knowledge of instructional design and planning
- Knowledge of appropriate student-centered learning environments
- Knowledge of instructional delivery and facilitation through a comprehensive understanding

of subject matter

- Knowledge of various types of assessment strategies for determining impact on student

learning

- Knowledge of relevant continuous professional improvement
- Knowledge of the Code of Ethics and Principles of Professional Conduct of the Education Profession in Florida
- Knowledge of research-based practices appropriate for teaching English Language Learners (ELLs)
- Knowledge of effective literacy strategies that can be applied across the curriculum to impact student learning

== FTCE Subject Area Examinations ==
The subject area tests are meant to test the various subjects prospective teachers in Florida will be teaching.

=== Grades 5-9 ===
- English
- General Sciences
- Mathematics
- Social Science

=== Grades 6-12 ===
- Agriculture
- Biology
- Business Education
- Chemistry
- Drama
- Earth/Space Science
- English
- Technology Education
- Journalism
- Marketing
- Mathematics
- Physics
- Social Science
- Speech

=== Grades K-12 ===
- Art
- Computer Science
- Educational Media Specialist (Includes Prekindergarten)
- ESOL(English for Speakers of Other Languages)
- Exceptional Student Education
- French
- German
- Guidance and Counseling (Includes Prekindergarten)
- Health
- Hearing Impaired
- Humanities
- Latin
- Music
- Physical Education
- Reading
- School Psychologist (Includes Prekindergarten)
- Spanish
- Speech-Language Impaired
- Visually Impaired

=== Other ===
- Elementary Education (Grades K-6)
- ESOL
- Family and Consumer Science
- Prekindergarten/Primary (Grades Prekindergarten - 3)
- Preschool Education (Ages 0–4)

== Passing Rates ==
Passing rates for various test are shown in the tables below. The tables list the percentage of first time test takers passing each exam, it then lists the percentage of all test takers passing for that year.

Results for the 4 sections of the general knowledge exam (GK) and the professional education exam are shown below.

Exam	2013	2014	2015	2016
GK-English Language Skills	89%	89%	67%	65%
GK-Essay	96%	93%	63%	69%
GK-Math	80%	80%	57%	57%
GK-Reading	84%	85%	56%	60%
Professional Education	87%	75%	77%	79%

Results of subject area exams are shown below

Exam	2013	2014	2015	2016
Biology 6-12	73%	73%	69%	76%
Chemistry 6-12	58%	66%	68%	67%
Mathematics 6-12	59%	56%	55%	55%
MG General Science 5-9	56%	53%	53%	56%
MG Social Science 5-9	81%	82%	74%	79%
Music K-12	88%	87%	89%	87%
Physics 6-12	55%	62%	52%	49%
Social Science 6-12	66%	67%	68%	67%
Spanish K-12	87%	89%	88%	84%

== See also ==
- Praxis test
