= Wilbur White (American football) =

American football player (1912–1968)

- Wilbur White, 1937

No. 33, 30
- Position: Halfback

Personal information
- Born: April 30, 1912; Seibert, Colorado, U.S.
- Died: April 1, 1968 (aged 55)
- Listed height: 6 ft 0 in (1.83 m)
- Listed weight: 167 lb (76 kg)

Career information
- High school: Fort Collins (CO)
- College: Colorado State (1931-1934)

Career history
- St. Louis Blues (1935); Brooklyn Dodgers (1935); Detroit Lions (1936)

Career statistics
- Games played: 11
- Passing Yards: 73
- Touchdowns: 2
- Stats at Pro Football Reference

Wilbur Walter "Red" White (April 30, 1912 – April 1968) was an American football player.

A native of Seibert, Colorado, White attended Fort Collins High School. As a senior in 1930, he tallied 136 points for the school's football team on 18 touchdowns and 28 points after touchdown. White then played college football at Colorado State University, receiving varsity letters each year from 1931 to 1934. Weighing only 148 pounds in 1931, and sometimes known as "Little Red" White, he handled the team's passing and kicking, and had several long touchdown runs. He was also a dangerous return specialist, returning a punt 60 yards on September 29, 1934. He was selected by the United Press as a first-team halfback on the 1934 All-Rocky Mountain football team.

He also played professional football in the National Football League (NFL) as a back for the Brooklyn Dodgers in 1935 and for the Detroit Lions in 1936. He appeared in 11 NFL games. He also played for the St. Louis Blues of the American Football League during a part of the 1935 season. During his time in the NFL, he carried the ball 24 times for a gain of 62 yards, completed 10 of 33 passes for 73 yards, and caught two passes for 21 yards. After his time with the Lions, White told the Fort Collins Express-Courier that he had offers to continue playing, but stated, "Ive had enough football."

White later worked for General Motors Acceptance Corporation and served as a lieutenant in the U.S. Army during World War II. He was married in 1937 to beauty queen Dorothy Weaver, and in 1942 to Clara Mae Hibbert. White died in 1968 at Lakewood, Colorado.
