= William Gace =

English translator

William Gace (fl. 1580), was an English translator.

== Life ==
Gace matriculated as a sizar of Clare Hall, Cambridge, in November 1568, and proceeded B.A. in 1573.

== Works ==
He was author of the following translations:

- A Learned and Fruitefull Commentarie upon the Epistle of James the Apostle. … Written in Latine by the learned Clerke, Nich. Hemminge … and newly translated into English by W. G., London, 1577 (by Niels Hemmingsen).
- Special and Chosen Sermons of D. Martin Luther collected out of his Writings. … Englished by W. G., London, 1578; another edition, London, 1581.
- A Guide unto godliness, moste worthy to bee followed of all true Christians. … Written in Latin by John Rivius; Englished by W. G., London, 1579 (by Johann Rivius).
- A right comfortable Treatise conteining sundrye pointes of consolation for them that labour & are laden. Written by D. Martin Luther to Prince Friderik, Duke of Saxonie; being sore sicke. … Englished by W. Gace, London, 1580.
