= Robert S. Murley =

American businessman

Robert Murley
- Education: Princeton University (BA); University of California, Los Angeles (MBA); London School of Economics (MS)
- Occupations: Businessman, philanthropist
- Spouse: Mary Pivirotto
- Children: 3

Robert Scott Murley is an American businessman. He serves as the chairman of the investment banking of Credit Suisse Securities and chairman of the Educational Testing Service (ETS).

== Early life ==
Robert S. Murley was raised by his mother, a public school teacher, with his two siblings. His father died when he was twelve years old.

Murley graduated with an A.B. in politics from Princeton University in 1972 after completing a senior thesis titled "The Micronesian Future Political Status Negotiations: A Dilemma for United States Policy in Western Pacific." He received a Master of Business Administration from the UCLA Anderson School of Management in 1974, and a Master of Science in international economics from the London School of Economics.

== Business career ==
Murley started his career at First Boston, later acquired by Credit Suisse, in New York City in 1975. He was transferred to the Chicago office eight years later. He became managing director of Credit Suisse in 1984 and vice chairman in 1998. He served as its chairman of investment banking in the Americas from 2005 to 2012. He serves as the chairman of the investment banking of Credit Suisse Securities.

Murley served as the chairman of the Educational Testing Service. Additionally, he has served on the board of directors of the Apollo Education Group.

Murley served on the board of directors of the Stone Energy Corporation. Additionally, he serves on the board of directors of Health Insurance Innovations.

== Philanthropy ==
Murley serves on the board of trustees of his alma mater, Princeton University. In 2004, Murley and his wife donated US$2 million to Princeton's Whitman College. Additionally, Murley serves as the chairman of the board of visitors of the UCLA Anderson School of Management.

Murley serves as vice chairman of the board of trustees of the Lurie Children's Hospital in Chicago, where he is a co-chair of the Heroes for Life fundraising campaign. He serves on the board of trustees of the Museum of Science and Industry, also in Chicago. In 2011, Murley made a charitable contribution to the Golden Apple Foundation, a non-profit organization which supports teaching excellence in underserved public schools in Illinois.

With his wife, Murley serves on the National Council of the American Enterprise Institute.

== Personal life ==
Murley is married to Mary Pivirotto, a Princeton alumna who serves on the Woman's Board of the Boys and Girls Clubs of Chicago. They have three children. They reside in Lake Forest, Illinois.
