= Case interview =

Type of job interview

A case interview is a job interview in which the applicant is presented with a challenging business scenario that they must investigate and propose a solution to. Case interviews are designed to test the candidate's analytical skills and "soft" skills within a realistic business context. The case is often a business situation or a business case that the interviewer has worked on in real life.

Case interviews are mostly used in hiring for management consulting jobs. Consulting firms use case interviews to evaluate candidate's analytical ability and problem-solving skills; they are looking not for a "correct" answer but for an understanding of how the applicant thinks and how the applicant approaches problems.

== Method ==
During case interviews, interviewers are generally looking for the following skills:

- Numerical and verbal reasoning skills
- Communication and presentation skills
- Business skills and commercial awareness

Candidates are often asked to estimate a specific number, often a commercial figure (such as market size or profitability) or determine action plans to remedy a business problem (such as low profitability or decreasing market share). Questions are generally ambiguous and require interviewees to ask questions or make assumptions to make a reasonable, supported argument to their solutions. Candidates are expected to demonstrate reasoning rather than to produce the exact answer.

A case interview can also be conducted as a group exercise. Here several candidates are given some briefing materials on a business problem and asked to discuss and agree upon a solution. The interviewers normally sit around the exterior of the room as silent observers. They assess candidates' communication and interaction as well as analytical thinking and commercial awareness. Interviewers "red flag" candidates who try to dominate the conversation; consultants work in teams so it's important to be a team player.

== Frameworks used by business analysts ==
An example of a framework used by business analysts is:

1. Benchmarking: Comparison of metrics to competitors
2. Balanced scorecard: Tracking key objectives as a prevention method
3. Porter's five forces: Industry analysis to assess potential company profitability
4. The General Electric-McKinsey nine-box matrix: Used to help assess opportunities
5. The BCG growth-share matrix: Used to assess relative product line strength
6. Core Competencies: Define proficiencies in areas unique to the company

== See also ==
- Case method
- Management consulting
