= GACE =

The Georgia Assessments for the Certification of Educators, also known as GACE (abbreviated) is a standardized test all teachers in the US state of Georgia must pass in order to teach at public schools and gain a credential.

The basic skills section is divided into three parts, three multiple choice (selected-response) sections of Reading, Writing, and Mathematics and one essay (constructed-response) portion which is part of the Writing section. Timing is for the entire exam, so examinees may take as much time in any testing area as needed, however the total exam time is four hours.
