= Graduate Management Admission Test =

Computer adaptive test (CAT)

Graduate Management Admission Test (GMAT)
- Acronym: GMAT
- Type: Computer-based standardized test
- Administrator: Graduate Management Admission Council
- Skills tested: Quantitative reasoning, verbal reasoning, data analysis
- Purpose: Admissions in graduate management programs of business schools.
- Year started: 1953 (73 years ago)
- Duration: 2 hours and 15 minutes long (with one optional 10-minute break)
- Score range: Quantitative section: 60-90, in 1 point increments, Verbal section: 60-90, in 1 point increments, Data Insights section: 60 to 90, in 1 point increments. Total score: 205 to 805.
- Score validity: 5 Years
- Offered: Multiple times a year.
- Restrictions on attempts: Yes
- Regions: 650 test centers in 114 countries.
- Languages: English
- Annual number of test takers: ▲78,429 unique candidates in 117,510 GMAT exams (T.Y. 2024)
- Prerequisites: No official prerequisite. Intended for those interested in graduate management education. Fluency in English assumed.
- Fee: US$ 275
- Used by: More than 7,700 programs at approximately 2,400 graduate business schools around the world accept the GMAT exam.
- Website: mba.com

The Graduate Management Admission Test (GMAT (/ˈdʒiːmæt/ (JEE-mat))) is a computer adaptive test (CAT) intended to assess certain analytical, quantitative, verbal, and data literacy skills for use in admission to a graduate management program, such as a Master of Business Administration (MBA) program. Answering the test questions requires reading comprehension, and mathematical skills such as arithmetic, and algebra. The Graduate Management Admission Council (GMAC) owns and operates the test, and states that the GMAT assesses critical thinking and problem-solving abilities while also addressing data analysis skills that are vital to real-world business and management success. It can be taken up to five times a year and attempts must be at least 16 days apart.

GMAT is a registered trademark of the Graduate Management Admission Council. More than 7,700 programs at approximately 2,400+ graduate business schools around the world accept the GMAT as part of the selection criteria for their programs. Business schools use the test as a criterion for admission into a wide range of graduate management programs, including MBA, Master of Accountancy, Master of Finance programs and others. The GMAT is administered online and in standardized test centers in 114 countries around the world. According to a survey conducted by Kaplan Test Prep, the GMAT is still the number one choice for MBA aspirants. According to GMAC, it has continually performed validity studies to statistically verify that the exam predicts success in business school programs. The number of test-takers of GMAT plummeted from 2012 to 2021 as more students opted for an MBA program that didn't require the GMAT.

== History ==
In 1953, the organization now called the Graduate Management Admission Council (GMAC) began as an association of nine business schools, whose goal was to develop a standardized test to help business schools select qualified applicants. In the first year it was offered, the assessment (now known as the Graduate Management Admission Test), was taken just over 2,000 times; in recent years, it has been taken more than 230,000 times annually. Initially used in admissions by 54 schools, the test is now used by more than 7,700 programs at approximately 2,400 graduate business schools around the world. On June 5, 2012, GMAC introduced an integrated reasoning section to the exam that aims to measure a test taker's ability to evaluate information presented in multiple formats from multiple sources. In April 2020, when the COVID-19 pandemic resulted in the closing of in-person testing centers around the world, GMAC quickly moved to launch an online format of the GMAT exam. Starting from January 31, 2024, the previous edition of the GMAT was replaced by the GMAT Exam (Focus Edition). It now consists of three sections: Verbal, Quantitative, and Data Insights, and is graded between 205 and 805 in 10-point intervals.

== Criticism ==
In 2013, an independent research study evaluated student performance at three full-time MBA programs and reported that the GMAT total score had a 0.29 statistical correlation with the first-year GPA (Grade Point Average) of the MBA programs while undergraduate GPA had a 0.35 correlation, suggesting that undergraduate performance was a stronger predictor of graduate school performance than GMAT scores. The AACSB score (a combination of GMAT total score and undergraduate GPA) provided the best predictive power (0.45 correlation) for the first-year performance on MBA core courses.

In 2017, GMAC conducted a large-scale validity study involving 28 graduate business programs, and the results showed that the median correlation between the GMAT Total score and graduate GPA was 0.38, the median correlation between the GMAT IR score and graduate GPA was 0.27, and the median correlation between undergraduate GPA and graduate GPA was 0.32. The results also showed that undergraduate GPA and GMAT scores (i.e., Verbal, Quant, IR, and AWA) jointly had a 0.51 correlation with graduate GPA.

== Format and timing ==
The GMAT exam consists of three sections: Quantitative Reasoning, Verbal Reasoning, and Data Insights. The total testing time is two hours and 15 minutes to answer 64 questions, and test takers have 45 minutes for each section.

Section	Duration in minutes	Number of questions
Quantitative Reasoning	45	21
Verbal Reasoning	45	23
Data Insights	45	20

All three sections of the GMAT exam are multiple-choice and are administered in a computer-adaptive format that adjusts to a test taker's ability level. At the start of each section, test takers are presented with a question of average difficulty. As questions are answered correctly, the computer presents increasingly difficult questions; conversely, as questions are answered incorrectly, it presents questions of decreasing difficulty. This process continues until test takers complete each section, at which point the computer has an accurate assessment of their ability level in that subject area and generates a raw score for each section.

On July 11, 2017, GMAC announced that from now on the order in which the different parts of the GMAT are taken can be chosen at the beginning of the exam. The three options were:

- Analytical Writing Assessment, Integrated Reasoning, Quantitative, Verbal (original order)
- Verbal, Quantitative, Integrated Reasoning, Analytical Writing Assessment
- Quantitative, Verbal, Integrated Reasoning, Analytical Writing Assessment

In April 2018, the GMAC officially shortened the test by half an hour, shortening the verbal and quantitative sections from 75 minutes each to 65 and 62 minutes, respectively, and shortening some of the instruction screens.

In October 2023, with the launched of the GMAT Exam (Focus Edition), GMAC further shortened the exam and removed the Analytical Writing Assessment section, as well as sentence correction and geometry questions. Additionally, section order selection was expanded, giving test takers the opportunity to take the exam in any order they choose. A Question Review & Edit feature was also introduced, giving test takers the ability to review all answers at the end of each section and edit up to three answers per section.

=== Quantitative Reasoning section ===
The Quantitative Reasoning section of the GMAT seeks to measure the ability to reason quantitatively and solve quantitative problems. Questions require knowledge of certain algebra and arithmetic. There is only one type of quantitative question: problem-solving. The use of calculators is not allowed on the quantitative section of the GMAT. Test takers must do their math work out by hand using a wet erase pen and laminated graph paper which are given to them at the testing center. Scores range from 60 to 90.

Problem-solving questions are designed to assess the ability to reason quantitatively and solve quantitative problems.

=== Verbal Reasoning section ===
The Verbal Reasoning section of the GMAT exam includes the following question types: reading comprehension and critical reasoning. Each question type gives five answer options from which to select. Verbal scores range from 60 to 90.

According to GMAC, the reading comprehension question type tests ability to analyze information and draw a conclusion. Reading comprehension passages can be anywhere from one to several paragraphs long. According to GMAC, the critical reasoning question type assesses reasoning skills.

=== Data Insights section ===
Data Insights is a section introduced in 2023 and is designed to measure a test taker's ability to evaluate data presented in multiple formats from multiple sources. The Data Insights section consists of 20 questions (which often consist of multiple parts themselves) in five different formats: data sufficiency, graphics interpretation, two-part analysis, table analysis, and multi-source reasoning. Data Insights scores range from 60 to 90.

The Data Insights section includes five question types: table analysis, graphics interpretation, multi-source reasoning, two-part analysis, and data sufficiency. In the table analysis section, test takers are presented with a sortable table of information, similar to a spreadsheet, which has to be analyzed. Each question will have several statements with opposite-answer options (e.g., true/false, yes/no), and test takers click on the correct option. Graphics interpretation questions ask test takers to interpret a graph or graphical image. Each question has fill-in-the-blank statements with pull-down menus; test takers must choose the options that make the statements accurate. Multi-source reasoning questions are accompanied by two to three sources of information presented on tabbed pages. Test takers click on the tabs and examine all the relevant information, which may be a combination of text, charts, and tables to answer either traditional multiple-choice or opposite-answer (e.g., yes/no, true/false) questions. Two-part analysis questions involve two components for a solution. Possible answers are given in a table format with a column for each component and rows with possible options. Test takers have to choose one response per column. Data sufficiency is a question type unique to the GMAT designed to measure the ability to understand and analyze a quantitative problem, recognize what information is relevant or irrelevant and determine at what point there is enough information to solve a problem or recognize the fact that there is insufficient information given to solve a particular problem.

== Historical format (until early 2024) ==
=== Analytical Writing Assessment (AWA) ===
No longer part of the GMAT exam, the AWA consisted of a 30-minute writing task—analysis of an argument. It was important to be able to analyze the reasoning behind a given argument and write a critique of that argument. The essay was given two independent ratings and these ratings were averaged together to determine the test taker's AWA score. One rating was given by a computerized reading evaluation and another was given by a person at GMAC who will read and score the essay themselves without knowing what the computerized score was. The automated essay-scoring engine was an electronic system that evaluated more than 50 structural and linguistic features, including organization of ideas, syntactic variety, and topical analysis. If the two ratings differed by more than one point, another evaluation by an expert reader was required to resolve the discrepancy and determine the final score.

The Analytical Writing Assessment was graded on a scale of 0 (minimum) to 6 (maximum) in half-point intervals. A score of 0 indicates that the response was either nonsensical, off-topic, or completely blank. It did not count towards a test taker's total GMAT score.

Essay score	Description
1	An essay that is deficient.
2	An essay that is flawed.
3	An essay that is limited.
4	An essay that is adequate.
5	An essay that is strong.
6	An essay that is outstanding.

=== Integrated Reasoning section ===
The Integrated Reasoning (IR) was a section introduced in June 2012 and was replaced by Data Insights in 2023. Similar to Data Insights, it was designed to measure a test taker's ability to evaluate data presented in multiple formats from multiple sources. The skills tested by the Integrated Reasoning section were identified in a survey of 740 management faculty worldwide as important for incoming students. The Integrated Reasoning section consisted of 12 questions (which often consisted of multiple parts themselves) in four different formats: graphics interpretation, two-part analysis, table analysis, and multi-source reasoning. Integrated Reasoning scores ranged from 1 to 8. Like the Analytical Writing Assessment (AWA), this section was scored separately from the Quantitative and Verbal section. Performance on the IR and AWA sections did not contribute to the total GMAT score.

== Scoring ==
The total GMAT Exam (Focus Edition) score ranges from 205 to 805 and measures performance on all three sections together. Scores are given in increments of 10 (e.g. 545, 555, 565, 575, etc.).

In 2023, for the GMAT Exam (Focus Edition), the score scale for the exam was adjusted to reflect changes in the test-taking population, which has become more diverse and global. Over the years, scores had shifted significantly, resulting in an uneven distribution. The updated score scale fixed that, allowing schools to better differentiate performance on the exam.

The final score is not based solely on the last question the examinee answers (i.e. the level of difficulty of questions reached through the computer adaptive presentation of questions). The algorithm used to build a score is more complicated than that. The examinee can make a mistake and answer incorrectly and the computer will recognize that item as an anomaly. If the examinee misses the first question, the final score will not necessarily fall in the bottom half of the range.

At the end of the exam, test takers are shown an unofficial preview of their GMAT score.

This score can be converted to a percentile using the GMAT Concordance table.

=== Use by high-IQ societies ===
Scores at or above the 99th percentile were accepted as qualifying evidence to join Intertel until 2024, but as of May 2025 Intertel no longer lists GMAT as a qualifying test for membership. According to an official study conducted by the GMAC, a score of at least 760 (715 for GMAT Focus Edition) is required to reach the 99th percentile.

A score of at least 746 qualifies one for admission to the International Society for Philosophical Enquiry, and a score of 750 (with the old pre-2023 test; a 705 score with the Focus edition since 2024) qualifies for admission to the Triple Nine Society, corresponding to the 98th percentile, despite both societies claiming to only accept members in the 99.9th percentile or above on a test of adult intelligence (i.e. they claim to be ten times more selective than Intertel, but are actually less selective with respect to GMAT scores).

== See also ==
- Business school
- Master of Accountancy
- Master of Business Administration
- List of admissions tests
