= List of tests =

The following is an alphabetized and categorized list of notable tests.

== Clinical psychology tests ==
Test	Description	Year
Beck Depression Inventory	Measures severity of Depression	1961
Depression Anxiety Stress Scales	Isolate and identify aspects of emotional disturbance	1965

== Cognitive development tests ==
Test	Description	Year
Draw-A-Person Test	Psychological projection test for children	1926
Knox Cubes	Nonverbal intelligence test	1913
Modern Language Aptitude Test	Foreign language test	—N/a
Multiple choice	Determine the best possible answer from a list.	1915
Pimsleur Language Aptitude Battery	Foreign language proficiency attainment predictor.	1966
Porteus Maze Test	Measures psychological planning capacity.	1914

== Intelligence tests ==
- Cattell Culture Fair
- Kohs block
- Woodcock–Johnson Tests of Cognitive Abilities
- Multidimensional Aptitude Battery II
- Leiter International Performance Scale
- Miller Analogies Test
- Otis–Lennon School Ability Test
- Raven's Progressive Matrices
- Stanford–Binet Intelligence Scales
- Sternberg Triarchic Abilities Test
- Turing test
- Wechsler Adult Intelligence Scale
- Wechsler Intelligence Scale for Children
- Wechsler Preschool and Primary Scale of Intelligence
- Wonderlic Test
- Iq test
- Trust metric

== Medical tests ==
Test	Description	Year
Apgar test	Quickly summarizes the health of newborn children.	1952
Biopsy	Cell or tissue sampling for examination.	?
Blood test	Blood sample laboratory test.	?
DNA test	Genetic diagnosis of vulnerabilities to inherited diseases and more.	?
Gait Abnormality Rating Scale	A videotape-based analysis of 16 facets of human gait.	1996
Glucose Tolerance Test	Glucose is given and blood samples taken afterward determine how quickly it is cleared from the blood.	1923
Ishihara colour test	A color perception test for red-green color deficiencies.	1917
Liver function test	Groups of blood tests that give information about the state of a patient's liver	N/A
Lumbar puncture	Cerebrospinal fluid (CSF) collection to confirm or exclude conditions	1891
Mantoux test	Tuberculosis screening tool.	1890
Pap smear	Cervical screening used to detect pre-cancerous and cancerous processes in the endocervical canal.	?
RAST test (radioallergosorbent test)	Blood test used to determine the substances a subject is allergic to.	1974
Uhlenhuth test	Forensic test to determine the species of a blood sample	1901
Urea Breath Test	A rapid diagnostic procedure used to identify infections by Helicobacter pylori.	?
Wassermann test	An antibody test for syphilis	?

== Self tests ==
Test	Description	Year
Mirror test	Determines whether a non-human animal possesses the ability of self-recognition	1970
Sally-Anne test	Measures a person's social cognitive ability to attribute false beliefs to others.	1985

== Statistical tests ==
- Ames test
- Chi-squared test
- Draize test
- Dixon's Q test
- F-test
- Fisher's exact test
- GRIM test
- Kolmogorov–Smirnov test
- Kuiper's test
- Likelihood-ratio test
- Median test
- Mann–Whitney U test
- Pearson's chi-squared test
- Rank product test
- Shapiro–Wilk test
- Statistical hypothesis testing
- Student's t-test
- Tukey's range test
- Tukey's test of additivity
- Welch's t test

== Personality tests ==
Test	Description	Year
Activity vector analysis (AVA)	psychometric questionnaire designed to measure four personality factors	1942
Bem Sex-Role Inventory	(Gender identification)	1974
Big Five personality traits	Five broad domains or dimensions of personality that are used to describe human personality	1961
California Psychological Inventory	(Self-report inventory)	
DISC assessment	A behavior assessment tool based on the DISC theory of psychologist William Moulton Marston, which centers on four “primary emotions” and associated behavioral traits: dominance, influence, steadiness, and conscientiousness.	1928
The Hand Test	A projective technique that utilizes ten unbound 3.5 x 4.5 inch cards	1983
EQSQ Test (Empathizing–systemizing theory)	Suggests that people may be classified on the basis of their scores along two dimensions: empathizing (E) and systemizing (S)	?
Eysenck Personality Questionnaire	Assesses the personality traits	1985
Hare Psychopathy Checklist	Psychopath presence	1970s
Herrmann Brain Dominance Instrument (HBDI)	Thinking preferences in people	1982
HEXACO model of personality structure Personality Inventory	Personality structure is a six-dimensional model of human personality	2004
Holland Codes (RIASEC) (Personality-occupation matching)	A theory of careers and vocational choice based upon personality types.	1990s
Inwald Personality Inventory	Personality inventory primarily used to screen applicants for high-risk positions such as police candidates.	1980
International Personality Item Pool (IPIP)	A public domain collection of items for use in personality tests.	N/A
Keirsey Temperament Sorter	Self-assessed personality questionnaire designed to help people better understand themselves.	?
Minnesota Multiphasic Personality Inventory (MMPI)	The most widely used and researched standardized psychometric test of adult personality and psychopathology.	1943
Millon Clinical Multiaxial Inventory (MCMI)	A psychological assessment tool intended to provide information on psychopathology	1969
Myers–Briggs Type Indicator (MBTI)	A psychometric questionnaire measuring psychological preferences in how most people perceive the world and make decisions, based on Carl Jung's four principal psychological functions of how humans experience the world – sensation, intuition, feeling, and thinking.	1921
Newcastle Personality Assessor (NPA)	A personality test designed to measure the test-taker's personality on five dimensions: Extroversion, Neuroticism, Conscientious, Agreeableness, and Openness.	?
Revised NEO Personality Inventory	A psychological personality inventory	1990
Robin Hood Morality Test	A simple psychology test	?
Rorschach inkblot test	A psychological test in which subjects' perceptions of inkblots are recorded and then analyzed using psychological interpretation, complex algorithms, or both.	1960s
Sokanu Interests, Personality, and Preferences Inventory	A psychological inventory used in career counseling and employee selection	2013
Structure of Temperament Questionnaire (STQ)	A test measuring 12 biologically-based (temperament) traits describing universal formal-dynamical aspects of behaviour	1989
Student Adaptation to College Questionnaire	A questionnaire to assess the adaptation of freshmen to college. Used to reduce adaptation problems and drop-outs	1987
Sixteen Personality Factor Questionnaire or 16PF Questionnaire (16PF)	A multiple-choice personality questionnaire which was developed over several decades of research by Raymond B. Cattell	1940s
Swedish Universities Scales of Personality	A personality test based on the older Karolinska Scales of Personality (KSP)	?
Taylor–Johnson Temperament Analysis	A personality test designed to measure nine common personality traits for the assessment of individual adjustment.	1941
Temperament and Character Inventory	An inventory for personality traits devised by Cloninger	?
Thematic Apperception Test	A projective psychological test	1930s
Thomas–Kilmann Conflict Mode Instrument	A psychological personality inventory	early 1970s
True Colors (personality) Test	A personality profiling system created by Don Lowry	1979
Woodworth Personal Data Sheet	Commonly cited as the first personality test	WWI

== Pure-mathematical tests ==
Test	Description	Year
Fermat primality test	A probabilistic test to determine whether a number is probable prime.	2001
Miller–Rabin primality test	Determines whether a given number is prime.	?
Primality test	Determines whether an input number is prime.	?

== Skills assessment tests ==
- Student assessment test
  - Scantron test
- Bourdon–Wiersma test
- Graduate Management Admission Test
- Graduate Record Examination (GRE)
- GRE Physics Test
- HESI exam
- Japanese-Language Proficiency Test
- Medical College Admission Test
- SAT college entrance test
- Screen test

== Language tests ==
- IELTS (International English Language Testing System)
- iTEP (International Test of English Proficiency)
- TEFL (Teaching English as a Foreign Language)
- TOEFL (Test of English as a Foreign Language)
- TOEIC (Test of English for International Communication)
- TSE (Test of Spoken English)
- DALF (Test of French Language)

== Industrial and manufacturing tests ==
Test	Description	Year
Acceptance test	A test conducted to determine if the requirements of a specification or contract are met.	N/A
Crash test	A form of destructive testing usually performed in order to ensure safe design standards in crashworthiness	N/A
Moose test	Performed to determine how well a certain vehicle evades a suddenly appearing obstacle.	1970s
Nondestructive testing (NDT/NDA)	Analysis techniques used in science and industry to evaluate the properties of a material, component or system without causing damage.	N/A
Sanity test	A basic test to quickly evaluate whether a claim or the result of a calculation can possibly be true.	N/A
Smoke test	Preliminary testing to reveal simple failures severe enough to reject a prospective software release.	N/A
Software testing	An investigation conducted to provide stakeholders with information about the quality of the product or service under test.	1979
Stress test	A form of deliberately intense or thorough testing used to determine the stability of a given system or entity.	N/A
Unit test	Software testing method by which individual units of source code are tested to determine whether they are fit for use.	N/A

== Laboratory (non-medical) tests ==
Test	Description	Year
Marsh test	Detection of arsenic.	1836
Paternity test	Biological parent–child relationship.	1920s
Radiocarbon dating	Aging organic material.	1940s

== Legal tests ==
Test	Description	Year
Berne three-step test	Standardize possible limitations and exceptions to exclusive rights under their respective national copyright laws.	1967
Habitual residence test	Standard used to determine the law which should be applied to determine a given legal dispute.	?
Caroline test	A 19th-century formulation of customary international law which said that the necessity for preemptive self-defense must be "instant, overwhelming, and leaving no choice of means, and no moment for deliberation."	?

== Miscellaneous and uncategorized tests ==
Test	Description	Year
Purity test	An Internet meme purported to determine the user's degree of innocence in worldly matters.	1980s
Nuclear testing	Determines the effectiveness, yield, and explosive capability of nuclear weapons.	1945
Wug test	Demonstrated that young children possess implicit knowledge of linguistic morphology.	1958

== See also ==
- List of standardized tests in the United States
