= List of psychological tests by gender difference =

This is a list of specific psychological tests by the effect size for gender as reported in the most recent meta-analysis or norm. Only some psychological tests have been the subject of such research.

The standard guidelines for interpreting effect size state that

- 0.2 is a small difference;
- 0.5 is medium difference, one that would be noticeable to a casual observer;
- 0.8 is large difference, one that would be obvious to a casual observer.

== Self-report scales ==
Test	Effect size	Higher scoring group	Year published
Kolb's Learning Styles Inventory - Concrete Experience	0.01	Women	1994
Kolb's Learning Styles Inventory - Reflective Observation	0.01	Women	1994
Kolb's Learning Styles Inventory - Active Experimentation	0.02	Women	1994
Barratt Impulsiveness Scale	0.11	Men	2011
Kolb's Learning Styles Inventory - Abstract Conceptualization	0.16	Men	1994
Narcissistic Personality Inventory	0.15	Men	2008
Rosenberg self-esteem scale	0.22	Men	1999
Tennessee Self-Concept Scale	0.48	Men	2009
Bem Sex-Role Inventory - Masculinity	0.48	Men	1997
Sensation Seeking Scale	0.48	Men	2011
Bem Sex-Role Inventory - Femininity	0.83	Women	2011

== Objective tests ==
Test	Effect size	Higher scoring group	Year published
Raven's Progressive Matrices	0.33	Men	2004
Purdue Spatial Visualization Test: Visualization of Rotations	0.57	Men	2013
Mental Rotations Test	0.94	Men	1985
