= Integrity Inventory =

The Integrity Inventory (stylized as I^{2}), is a nationally normed entry-level personnel selection tool that incorporates employment integrity testing. It was developed by industrial organizational psychologist Mark Tawney, Ph.D., Principal and Vice President of IOS, Inc., or Industrial/Organizational Solutions Inc, referred to as IOS in the 2009 United States Supreme Court case, Ricci v. DeStefano. In the United States, vocations within the public safety sector, (i.e., firefighter, sheriff and police officer, correctional officer, emergency medical services including emergency medical technician); and employment in for-profit retail and wholesale business, and nonprofit sectors often require Industrial and Organizational Psychology employment testing, for initial employment and advancement throughout the ranks.

== Overview ==
The Integrity Inventory, when used as a pre-employment screening tool, predicts individuals’ likelihood of engaging in Counterproductive work behaviors including assessing: ethics and moral character, work attitudes, theft attitudes, potential for substance abuse (i.e., alcohol or drug use), emotional stability, turnover intentions, and/or behaviors that are hazardous and place the civilian population and coworkers at heightened risks.

Qualified individuals with a reduced risk of such counterproductive workplace behaviors are selected for employment, leading to a more productive workforce.

Counterproductive workplace behaviors lead to real financial losses for business; in the public safety and private sector, such behaviors are hazardous and place the civilian population and coworkers at heightened risk. As such, the prediction of counterproductive workplace behaviors constitutes a business necessity as outlined in the U.S. Equal Employment Opportunity Commission’s Uniform Guidelines on Employee Selection Procedures. Psychological testing is a standard and growing practice for human resources departments throughout the United States who seek high integrity employees.

This exam has the sensitivity needed to accurately assess the individuals that will be charged with protecting our lives, families, property, and businesses. The Integrity Inventory displays no adverse impact against protected classes and allows you to select and rank-order candidates most likely to succeed based on their integrity and honesty.
