= Situational judgement test =

Psychological test

A situational judgement test (SJT), also known as a situational stress test (SStT) or situational stress inventory (SSI), is a type of psychological test that presents the test-taker with realistic, hypothetical scenarios. The person taking the test is then asked to identify the most appropriate response or to rank the responses in order of effectiveness. SJTs can be administered through various modalities, such as booklets, films, or audio recordings. These tests represent a distinct psychometric approach compared to the traditional knowledge-based multiple-choice items and are frequently utilized in industrial-organizational psychology applications, such as personnel selection.

SJTs are designed to assist in determining behavioral tendencies by assessing how an individual might behave in specific situations. They also evaluate knowledge instruction by assessing the effectiveness of potential responses. Moreover, situational judgment tests may reinforce the status quo within an organization.

Unlike most psychological tests, SJTs are not typically acquired off-the-shelf; instead, they are bespoke tools, tailored to suit specific role requirements. This is because SJTs are not defined by their content but by their method of design.

== Developing a situational judgement test ==
Developing a situational judgement test begins with conducting a job analysis that includes collecting critical incidents. These critical incidents are used to develop different situations where the judgement of the prospective new hire would need to make a decision. Once these situations are developed, subject matter experts (excellent employees) are asked to suggest effective and less effective solutions to the situation. Then a different group of subject matter experts rate these responses from best to worst and the test is scored with the highest ranked options giving the respondent the higher score (or lower if the test is reverse scored).

== Validity ==
The validity of the test corresponds to the types of questions that are being asked. Knowledge instruction questions correlate more highly with general mental ability while behavioral tendency questions correlate more highly with personality.

Key results from a study show that knowledge about interpersonal behavior measured with situational judgement tests was valid for internships (7 years later) as well as job performance (9 years later). Also, students' knowledge of interpersonal behavior showed progressive validity over cognitive factors for predicting academic and post academic success. This study was also the first study to show evidence of the predictive long-term power of interpersonal skill assessed though situational judgement tests.

There are many problems within scoring SJTs. "Attempts to address this issue include expert-novice differences, where an item is scored in the direction favoring the experts after the average ratings of experts and novices on each item are compared; expert judgement, where a team of experts decides the best answer to each question; target scoring, where the test author determines the correct answer; and consensual scoring, where a score is allocated to each option according to the percentage of people choosing that option."

== History ==
The situational judgement test has been around for over fifty years. The first two that were documented were the How supervise and the Cardall Practical Judgement Test. In 1958 the Supervisory Practice Test came about by Bruce and Learner. The Supervisory Practice Test was to point out whether or not supervisors could handle certain situations on the job. This test is said to effectively identify who could and could not be a supervisor. The situational judgement test did not really take off and become a great use in the employment field until the early 1990s.

Situational Judgement Tests then went on to be used in World War II by psychologists in the US military. "In the 1950s and 60s, their use was extended to predict, as well as assess, managerial success."

Today, SJTs are used in many organizations, are promoted by various consulting firms, and are researched by many. However, their use has been criticized in admissions screening due to bias against lower income individuals and male applicants.

== Tests to measure individual adaptability in applied settings ==
A thesis submitted to George Mason University in 2010 by Adam M. Grim created a study to measure individual adaptability in applied settings. An Adaptability Situational Judgement Test (ASJT) was designed to provide a practical and valid selection and assessment instrument that had incremental validity beyond the Big Five personality traits and cognitive ability in predicting supervisor ratings of adaptability. "The research contributes to the selection and adaptive performance literatures by demonstrating that it is possible to use a situational judgement test to measure individual adaptability in both military and non-military applied settings." ASJT had similar relationships with all variables of interest in both samples, thus providing support for the generalizability of the measure to both military and business settings. Practical implications and recommendations for future refinements of ASJT are discussed. With this ASJT did not have differential validity and provides a selection instrument that would not cause adverse impact or be subject to legal challenge because of predictive bias. For this study there were both business and military setting scenarios which subjects would read and indicate how likely they were to do the list of behaviors related to that scenario.

== Multiple-choice examples ==
Consist of either taking the test on paper or written out examples online. The online version offers a few advantages such as, faster results. It is often the case that Situational Judgement Test have multiple correct answers even though an answer might be more preferred by the hiring organization.

You are the leader of a manufacturing team that works with heavy machinery. One of your productions operators tells you that one machine in the work area is suddenly malfunctioning and may endanger the welfare of your work team. Rank order the following possible courses of action to effectively address this problem. from most desirable to least desirable. 1. Call a meeting of your team members to discuss the problem. 2. Report the problem to the Director of Safety 3. shut off the machine immediately. 4. Individually ask other production operators about problems with their machines. 5.evacuate your team from the production facility. Other typical examples can be found here.

== Video-based examples ==
Consists of videos that contain different scenarios that the employee may face. Scenarios for this section can be found on YouTube.com.

Scenarios are in many different styles such as:

- Animated people and situations.
- The boss of the company could be recorded asking the question.
- The answering process can be different for each test.
  - The correct answer could be given.
  - The individual could be ask to give the most reasonable answer.
  - The individual is asked to explain what they were to do if they were in that situation.

== Advantages over other measures ==
SJTs offer several advantages over other psychometric assessments. One significant benefit is their reduced levels of adverse impact by gender and ethnicity compared to cognitive ability tests. SJTs use measures that directly assess job-relevant behaviors, enhancing their applicability in real-world settings.

Administration of SJTs can be conducted in bulk, either via traditional pen-and-paper methods or online platforms, offering flexibility in large-scale testing. The design process of SJTs results in content that is more relevant than other assessment types, leading to greater acceptance and engagement from candidates. Unlike cognitive ability tests, the scenarios in SJTs are based on real incidents, making them more relatable and practical.

Practice is unlikely to significantly enhance candidate performance in SJTs because the answers cannot be logically deduced; what is appropriate in one organizational context may be inappropriate in another. SJTs are capable of assessing a variety of constructs, including problem-solving, decision-making, and interpersonal skills. This contrasts with traditional psychometric tests, which often fail to consider the interaction between ability, personality, and other traits.

Moreover, conscientiousness can be integrated into SJTs as a major factor of individual differences. When used in combination with knowledge-based tests, SJTs provide a more comprehensive evaluation of a candidate's aptitude for specific job roles.

== Company use ==
Companies using SJTs report the following anecdotal evidence supporting the use of SJT. Note: these reports are not supported by peer-reviewed research.

- Can highlight employee developmental needs
- They are relatively easy and cost-effective to develop, administer and score
- There has been more favorable applicant reactions to this test than to general mental ability tests.

== Pre-hiring use ==
SJTs are a popular tool that employers use during the hiring process to weed out potential hires. Some professions that almost always require SJT exams are administrative, management, firefighters, customer service, nursing, call centers, and police officers. It's important to note that each profession may have its own situational judgement test specific to that particular field. However, generally, most SJTs include various question types and do not have a time limit.

One of the most popular question types on SJTs are scenarios. Scenarios are job-related, realistic, hypothetical situations. As the scenarios presented on SJTs always ask for a resolution for a given conflict, candidates will be asked to choose a preferred method of action out of several possible options. The conflict/scenario may involve supervisor-subordinate relationships, stress and disagreement between colleagues, etc. The situations described may vary according to the role one is applying for. If scenarios are presented, candidates can expect to encounter 25–50 questions.

Other SJT test question types are multiple-choice, most-least or best/worst answer tables (where more than one option must be chosen on a certain scale), ranking and rating, or short video scenes (simulates the situation being asked about).

== Criticisms ==
SJTs have faced several criticisms, particularly regarding their use in admissions screening, such as the multiple mini-interview, which has been shown to cause gender and socioeconomic bias. The brevity of scenarios in many SJTs can prevent candidates from becoming fully immersed, thereby reducing the intended realism and potentially affecting the quality and depth of assessment.

Moreover, SJT responses can sometimes be transparent, merely reflecting best practice knowledge without effectively differentiating between candidates' work-related performance. The response formats in some SJTs may not offer a comprehensive range of responses, forcing candidates to choose actions that do not accurately reflect their behavior. This limitation can be frustrating for candidates and may impact the validity of the measures.

There are ongoing debates about the adaptability of SJTs and their validity in measuring specific constructs, such as job knowledge, versus a broader range of constructs like cognitive ability, conscientiousness, agreeableness, or emotional stability. SJTs are designed to assess multiple constructs simultaneously, making it difficult to isolate and measure individual constructs. Consequently, if one construct is of particular interest, other measures might be more suitable.

Additionally, the multi-dimensional nature of SJTs poses challenges in assessing reliability through standard measures. While SJTs might reduce certain kinds of visual bias, they can reinforce others, potentially promoting uniform work and cultural values. Furthermore, the ability to prepare for SJTs may reinforce socioeconomic advantages and benefit those with social links to the organization.

== See also ==
- Objective test
- Employment testing
- Projective test
- Psychological testing
