= Activity vector analysis =

Type of personality test

Activity vector analysis (AVA) is a psychometric questionnaire designed to measure four personality factors or vectors: aggressiveness, sociability, emotional control and social adaptability. It is used as an employment test.

The AVA was developed by the psychologist Walter V. Clarke in 1942, based on work by Prescott Lecky, William Marston and others.

== See also ==
- DISC assessment
- List of personality tests
- Myers-Briggs Type Indicator
