= Paul Uhlenhuth =

Developer of the first forensic test to distinguish human from animal blood

Professor Paul Uhlenhuth
- Born: 7 January 1870; Hanover
- Died: 13 December 1957 (aged 87); Freiburg im Breisgau
- Awards: Member of the Royal Swedish Academy of Sciences, Commander of the Order of Merit of the Federal Republic of Germany, National Prize of East Germany
- Scientific career
- Fields: Medical microbiology, immunology
- Workplaces: University of Strasbourg, University of Marburg, University of Freiburg

Paul Theodor Uhlenhuth (7 January 1870 in Hanover – 13 December 1957 in Freiburg im Breisgau) was a German bacteriologist and immunologist, and Professor at the University of Strasbourg (1911–1918), at the University of Marburg (1918–1923) and at the University of Freiburg (1923–1936). He was a rector of the University of Freiburg from 1928 to 1929. After his retirement in 1936, he led his own research institute in Freiburg, known as the State Research Laboratory, until his death in 1957.

He is famous in the annals of forensic science for developing the species precipitin test, known as the Uhlenhuth test, which could distinguish human blood from animal blood in 1901, a discovery which had tremendous importance in criminal justice in the 20th century. In 1915, he discovered the pathogen of Weil's disease. He also invented the arsenic treatment of syphilis and the antimony treatment of many tropical diseases, and was an influential promoter of cancer research. He was a recipient of numerous honours, and was a member of the Academy of Sciences Leopoldina and the Royal Swedish Academy of Sciences. He was nominated for the Nobel Prize in Medicine 40 times between 1910 and 1952, notably by Nobel laureate Karl Landsteiner. At the time of his death, he was one of the most celebrated medical researchers in Germany, and one of the rare examples of someone who was equally celebrated in the west and east during the Cold War.

== Career and research ==
Starting with the a significant discovery by Emil von Behring that animals inoculated with diphtheria toxin formed defensive substances in their blood serum. These defensive substances were named precipitins. Other scientists principally Jules Bordet tried devising serums against other infectious agents; They found that the precipitins were specific to the antagonist injected. In 1900, building off Bordet's work, Uhlenhuth injected hen's blood into rabbits, then he mixed serum from the rabbit with egg white. The egg proteins separated (precipitated) from the mixture. He was able to conclude that the blood of different species of animals contained unique proteins. These discoveries extended to being able to differentiate human blood from animal blood.

Fellow scientist, Otto Beumer, professor of forensic medicine at the University of Greifswald and the coroner of Greifswald, learned of Uhlenhuth's work and joined him in perfecting the detection of human blood in dried bloodstains that were months or years old.

His new technique was first used in the case of four children who had been murdered and dismembered in the town of Göhren on the Baltic island of Rügen in 1898 and 1901. The suspect in both cases, Ludwig Tessnow claimed in 1901 that the stains on his clothing were either cattle's blood or wood stain from his occupation as a carpenter. Due to advances in forensic technology, in which one could differentiate blood from other stains such as wood dye, investigators were able to prove otherwise. Tessnow was executed for his crime in 1904.

In 1915 Uhlenhoth was co-discoverer of Leptospira interrogans strain RGA, a cause of Weil's disease, a severe form of leptospirosis characterized by epistaxis, jaundice, chills, fever, muscle pain, and hepatomegaly, it was one of the many ailments to afflict soldiers involved in the trench warfare of World War I.

In 1942 he was awarded the Emil von Behring prize, which is awarded every two years by the University of Marburg for outstanding achievements in immunology, serum therapy and chemotherapy. Uhlenhuth had multiple articles published in peer-reviewed journals and was an active researcher in various areas of bacteriology and immunology including research into chemotherapy and syphilis. Paul Ehrlich, winner of the 1908 Nobel Prize in Medicine, was an associate of Uhlenhuth.

After he retired from his chair at the University of Freiburg in 1936, he led his own research institute in Freiburg, originally known as the State Research Laboratory. The institute was established with financial support from the German Research Council and was led by Uhlenhuth until his death in 1957 at the age of nearly 88. In the early 1950s, the institute became part of the Faculty of Medicine at the University of Freiburg. Uhlenhuth was a lifelong monarchist and was generally known by the title Geheimrat, which he had been awarded during the monarchy. From the 1930s he took an interest in building cooperation with Japanese medical scientists.

== Paul Uhlenhuth and Nazi Germany ==
Uhlenhuth's activities in the Third Reich cast a deep shadow on his scientific achievements. According to Ernst Klee's Das Personenlexikon zum Dritten Reich. Wer war was vor und nach 1945 – one of the most respected and reliable sources on the topic of individual Nazi involvement in the Third Reich - in April 1933 Uhlenhuth actively supported the firing of his Jewish colleagues and six years later, in 1939, he joined the ranks of the NSDAP. Later, the scientist's picture gets even darker: in 1944 Paul Uhlenhuth contacted the Oberkommando der Wehrmacht (High Command of the Armed Forces in Nazi Germany) to obtain their consent to carry out medical experiments on non-white prisoners of war. Those experiments involved immunisation trials and blood tests on members of other than white ethnic groups.

The latest publications about Uhlenhuth's activities under the Nazi Regime in 1933–1945 led to the renaming of streets honouring his name in both Freiburg and in his hometown of Hannover.

== Honours (selection) ==
Over half a century until his death, Uhlenhuth received numerous honours for his work, including

- The honorary title Geheimrat (Privy Councillor), 1906
- Fellow of the Academy of Sciences Leopoldina, 1932
- Foreign Member of the Royal Swedish Academy of Sciences, 1936
- Emil von Behring Prize, 1942
- Honorary citizen of Freiburg, 1950
- National Prize of East Germany First Class "for his influential research in the fields of bacteriology and hygiene," 1953
- Commander of the Order of Merit of the Federal Republic of Germany, 1955
- Honorary doctorate in medicine, Ghent University
- Honorary doctorate in veterinary medicine, Hanover Veterinary College
- Honorary doctorate in medicine, University of Greifswald, 1955
- Honorary President of the German Society for Hygiene and Microbiology, 1955
- Honorary member of the Microbiological Society of Berlin, 1955

== Bibliography ==
- Das Biologische Verfahren Zur Erkennung Und Unterscheidung Von Menschen Und Tierblut (1905) by Paul Theodor Uhlenhuth Publisher: Kessinger Pub Co (November 2009) Language: German ISBN 1-120-44466-7 ISBN 978-1-120-44466-0
- Uhlenhuth, P., and Mulzer, P.: Gelungene Verimpfung von Blut, Blut-serum und Sperma syphilitischer Menschen in die Hoden von Kaninchen. Berl. klin. Wchnschr., 49: 152, 1912.
- Uhlenhuth, P., and Mulzer, P.: Wei te re Mitteilungen über die Infektiosität des Blutes und anderer Kôrper-flussigkeiten syphilitischer Menschen fiir
- Handbuch der pathogenen Mikroorganismen. Herausgegeben von W. Kolle, R. Kraus und P. Uhlenhuth. Lieferung 41, Band VII: Weilische Krankheite. Von Prof. Dr. P. Uhlenhuth und Prof. Dr. W. Fromme. Die kurzfristigen Spirochätenfieber. Von Dr. G. Baermann. Geflügelspirochäte. Von Prof. Dr. G. Sobernheim. Die spontane Kaninchenspirochätose. Von Dr. W. Worms. Third edition. Paper. Price, 32 marks. pp. 487–752, with illustrations. Jena: Gustav Fischer, 1930

== External References ==
- The Episode “Blood” from the series “Adventure of Criminalistics” IMDB about Paul Uhlenhuth.

== Literature ==
- Herbert A. Neumann, Paul Uhlenhuth: Ein Leben für die Forschung, ABW Wissenschaftsverlag, 2004, 269 pages, ISBN 3936072337
