= SJT =

SJT may refer to:

- IATA code SJT for San Angelo Regional Airport
- Situational judgement test, a form of psychological test
- The Stephen Joseph Theatre in Scarborough
