= Ludwig Tessnow =

German serial killer (1872-1904)

- Born: 15 February 1872; Prussia
- Died: 1904 (age 32); Greifswald Prison, Greifswald, German Empire
- Cause of death: Execution by guillotine
- Other names: The Monster of Rügen; The Mad Carpenter of Rügen
- Status: Executed
- Conviction: Murder (2 counts)
- Penalty: Death

Details
- Victims: 4
- Span of crimes: 1898–1901
- Country: Germany
- States: Lower Saxony, Mecklenburg-Vorpommern
- Date apprehended: 2 July 1901

Ludwig Tessnow (15 February 1872 – ca. 1904) was a German serial killer known as the Monster of Rügen and the Mad Carpenter of Rügen, who murdered four prepubescent children in two separate attacks in 1898 and 1901.

Due to advances in forensic science, by 1901 biologists were able to determine whether the origins of stains recovered from crime scenes or upon a suspect's body or clothing were from blood, and whether such bloodstains originated from a human or animal. Consequently, although investigators had been unable to prove extensive staining found upon Tessnow's clothing following his 1898 murders was wood dye, as he had claimed, or human blood, by the time he committed his 1901 murders, pioneering precipitin testing enabled investigators to prove his clothing had been extensively stained with both human and animal blood, despite his claims to the contrary. This forensic testing ultimately proved Tessnow's guilt. He was allegedly beheaded by guillotine in 1904.

The tests conducted by biologist Paul Uhlenhuth upon Tessnow's clothing proved to be the first instance in which the forensic analysis of bloodstains was used in the conviction of a criminal.

== Murders ==
=== Heidemann and Langemeier ===
On the morning of 9 September 1898, two seven-year-old girls named Hannelore Heidemann and Else Langemeier left their neighbouring homes near Lechtingen (now a district of Wallenhorst), north of the town of Osnabrück, to attend the village school, located just 300 yards from the Heidemanns' cottage. When both girls failed to arrive home for lunch at 12:15 p.m., their frantic mothers visited the village school, only to discover that neither child had arrived at school that morning.

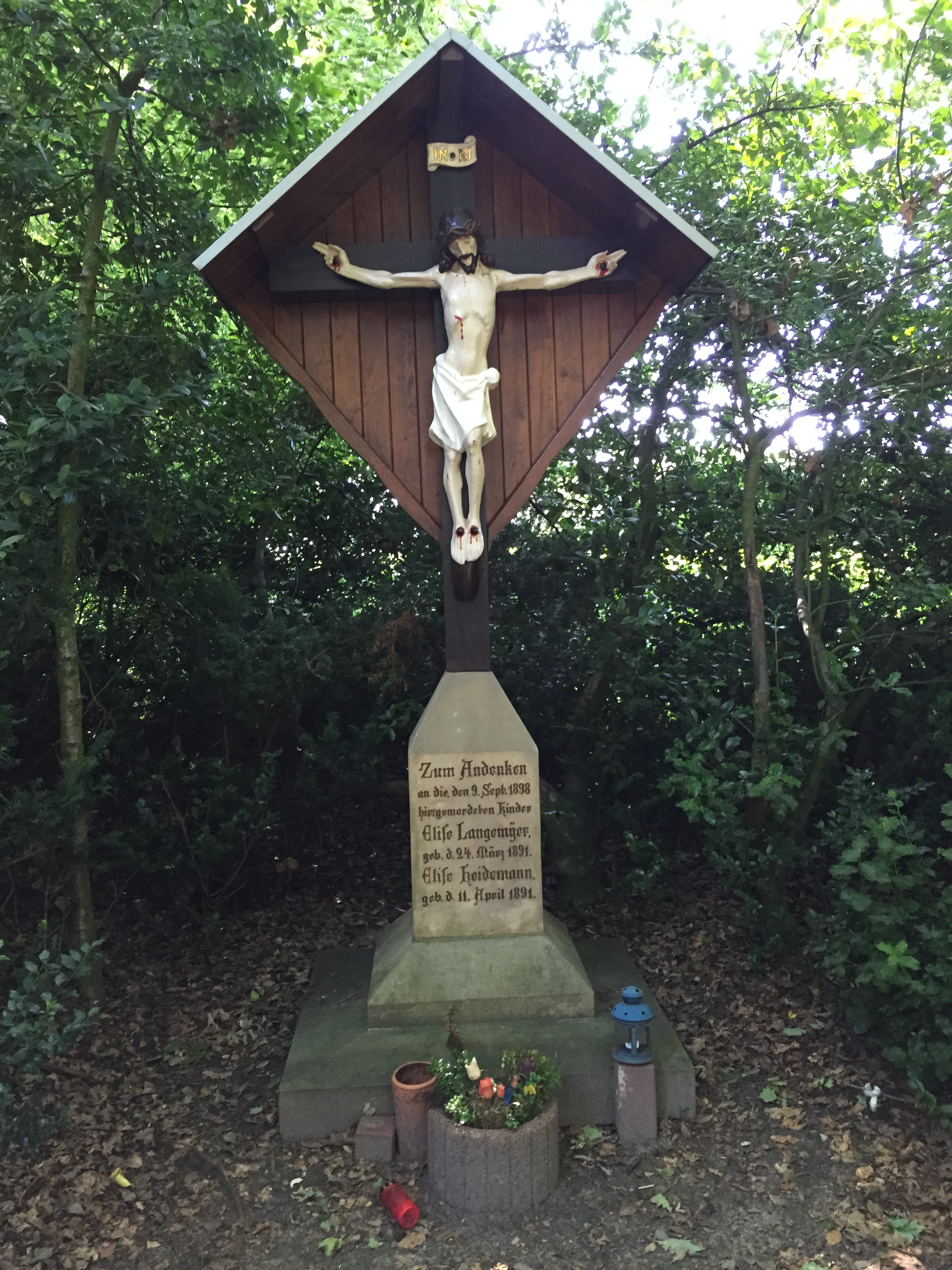
Monument to Hannelore Heidemann and Else Langemeier, erected in Lechtingen

Both Jadwiga Heidemann and Irmgard Langemeier fetched their husbands from work to initiate a search for their daughters. This search was assisted by several friends and neighbours and covered the entire village. After three hours the search radius was expanded to include nearby woodlands. Shortly after 9 p.m., these volunteers discovered the nude body of Hannelore Heidemann. The child had been extensively mutilated and dismembered, with sections of her body strewn about the forest. Later that evening, local police discovered the nude body of Else Langemeier concealed within bushes close to where Heidemann had been found. (Note: Following the discovery of Heidemann's body, the search party informed local police of their discovery. Local police then undertook a search of the woodland to locate Langemeier.) Her body had also been extensively mutilated and dismembered.

Police questioning of local residents produced a witness who informed police he had observed a local carpenter named Ludwig Tessnow walking into the village from the direction of the woodland on the morning of the children's disappearance. Furthermore, this witness claimed Tessnow's clothing was heavily stained with dark, reddish-brown blotches. Tessnow was arrested, still wearing this stained clothing.

Tessnow protested his innocence, insisting the ample dark stains upon his clothing were wood dye which had spattered onto his clothing in recent carpentry jobs he had performed for locals, and that the eyewitness had observed him walking in the direction of his home from one of these jobs. Furthermore, although a button found at the crime scene matched the buttons upon his suit (which was missing one button), Tessnow claimed he had lost the button several weeks prior.

In his questioning, Tessnow displayed no signs of nervousness or agitation, or any indications he suffered from a form of mental illness. He was eventually released from custody due to a lack of sufficient evidence. (Note: The prevailing view at the time was that only a mentally disturbed individual could commit such brutal acts of murder.) Tessnow made no attempt to leave Lechtingen, and was observed wearing this stained clothing on several subsequent occasions. In January 1899, he relocated to the village of Baabe in the district of Mecklenburg-Vorpommern.

=== Stubbe brothers ===
On the evening of 1 July 1901, two young brothers named Hermann and Peter Stubbe (aged eight and six) disappeared in the Baltic resort of Göhren, having informed their parents of their intentions to play near the family home. When the brothers failed to return home for supper, their father, several neighbours and the village policeman briefly searched the village for the brothers before they were reported missing.

The following morning, the brothers' bodies were found by a neighbour concealed in a thicket in the stretch of woodland close to their home. Both had been extensively bludgeoned with a large stone found close to the bodies, and both brothers had been mutilated to the same degree as Heidemann and Langemeier, with dismembered sections of their bodies scattered over a wide area of the woodland. The skull of Peter Stubbe had been crushed. His neck had been severed to the spine, with a jagged wound inflicted to his abdomen causing his intestines to protrude. His heart had also been extracted. The pelvis and legs of Hermann Stubbe had been severed, and were later discovered at an unspecified location. The heart of the older boy was also missing and was never found.

Police questioning of all local residents produced one eyewitness who stated she had observed the brothers talking with a "journeyman carpenter" named Ludwig Tessnow on the afternoon of their disappearance. This witness stated Tessnow was a native of Rügen and a locally eccentric figure, who lived in a neighbouring village.

== Arrest ==
Tessnow was arrested and taken into custody on 2 July, protesting his innocence. A routine search of his home revealed several items of clothing which, although still damp from having been recently washed, bore dark stains reminiscent of blood. A heavily stained pair of boots were recovered from beneath a stone sink in Tessnow's kitchen. These boots had also been washed. When questioned as to the source of these stains, Tessnow claimed the stains were wood dye which had spattered onto his clothes via his profession as a carpenter. His story was not believed, and he was remanded in custody, to await trial before the examining magistrates at Greifswald.

The local prosecutor, Ernst Hubschmann, discovered that less than three weeks prior to the brothers' murders, a local farmer had observed a young man fleeing from one of his meadows. This farmer then discovered that seven of his sheep had been mutilated, with numerous limbs and viscera strewn about the field. (Note: The mutilation of these sheep had initially been ascribed to witchcraft rites.) Noting the similarities between the manner in which these animals had been mutilated and their limbs and organs scattered about the crime scene and the Stubbe brothers' crime scene, Hubschmann arranged for this farmer to view a lineup of possible suspects, in which the farmer identified Tessnow as the man he had observed fleeing from his meadow. Tessnow admitted to having read newspaper reports of this incident but also protested his innocence in the killing of the sheep; again insisting the stains upon his clothing and boots were not human or animal blood, but wood dye.

=== Link to 1898 murders ===
Having read Tessnow's statement, the examining magistrate, Johann-Klaus Schmidt, noticed similarities between his accounts of wood dye being the source of the stains on his clothes and the excuse given by a potential suspect in the 1898 murders of two children near Osnabrück. Schmidt soon learned this suspect had been Tessnow, and that he had been released from custody by Osnabrück police due to a lack of evidence. The murders themselves remained unsolved.

=== Forensic examination ===
Shortly before the murders of the Stubbe brothers, a German biologist, Paul Uhlenhuth, had developed a method that allowed the detection of human and animal blood: the precipitin test. Uhlenhuth had been an assistant since 1899 at the Hygiene Institute of the University of Greifswald. Hubschmann conducted a meeting with the examining magistrate to discuss whether Uhlenhuth should be commissioned to conduct forensic tests on the items of clothing and footwear recovered from Tessnow's home. The decision was approved and two separate packages containing Tessnow's clothing and footwear, plus the stained stone recovered at the Stubbe crime scene, were sent to Uhlenhuth on 29 July and 1 August.

On 8 August 1901, Uhlenhuth submitted a report, dated 5 August, to police in which he conclusively determined that although some stains upon Tessnow's overalls, clothing and shoes were actually wood dye, the vast majority of the stains upon his clothing were human blood, with some bloodstains found upon Tessnow's jacket and trousers also sourcing from sheep. (Note: Uhlenhuth's report stated human blood was located in six places upon Tessnow's coat, in seven locations upon his trousers, upon four locations on his waistcoat, and one place respectively upon his cap and vest.) Uhlenhuth was also able to determine the discolourations upon the large stone found at the crime scene were also human blood, indicating this stone had been used to extensively bludgeon both brothers.

== Trial ==
Tessnow's trial for the murders of the Stubbe brothers was held in the spring of 1902 in Greifswald. Tessnow pleaded not guilty to two charges of murder and a third charge of murderous assault.

The chief prosecution witness was Paul Uhlenhuth, who testified as to his findings that, contrary to Tessnow's insistence the stains upon his clothing and boots were wood dye, all the garments were stained with human and animal blood. Several psychiatric experts also testified at the trial; each stating Tessnow had murdered the brothers in a state of "degenerate moral responsibility". Six psychiatrists testified on behalf of the defence to their conclusions that Tessnow was insane at the time he committed the murders.

Tessnow's trial lasted ten days. He was convicted of both murders and sentenced to death by beheading, with an additional sentence of two years' imprisonment imposed relating to the charge of murderous assault. He was also sentenced to suffer the loss of all his political rights.

Tessnow appealed his conviction. However, on 14 March 1904, the appeal hearing at Reichsgericht in Leipzig confirmed the judgment.

=== Execution ===
Tessnow was allegedly beheaded by guillotine in the courtyard of the Greifswald prison in 1904. (Note: A defence lawyer has claimed Tessnow's death sentence was secretly commuted to one of life imprisonment in a house of correction. No contemporary records exist to confirm Tessnow's execution, and some sources claim he died in 1939.)

== Aftermath ==
The forensic methods used by Paul Uhlenhuth to identify the origins of bloodstains via precipitin testing were officially introduced as court-proven evidence in Prussia on 8 September 1903. Later, this testing method was extended to identifying the sources of other bodily secretions such as saliva and semen.

== See also ==
- Capital punishment in Germany
- List of serial killers by country
- List of serial killers by number of victims

== Literature ==
- Evans, Colin (1996). The Casebook of Forensic Detection: How Science Solved 100 of the World's Most Baffling Crimes. John Wiley& Sons Inc. ISBN 978-0-471-07650-6.
- Innes, Brian (2000). Bodies of Evidence. Amber Books Ltd. p. 145. ISBN 978-1-856-05623-6.
- Lane, Brian (1994) [1991]. The Butchers. Index. ISBN 978-1-852-27297-5.
- Lane, Brian; Gregg, Wilfred (1995) [1992]. The Encyclopedia Of Serial Killers. Headline Book Publishing. ISBN 978-0-747-23731-0.
- Latta, Sara (2018). Investigating DNA and Blood: Dead People do Tell Tales. Enslow Publishing. ISBN 978-0-766-09544-1.
- Lloyd, Georgina (1986). One Was Not Enough: True Stories of Multiple Murderers. Bantam Books. ISBN 978-0-553-17605-6.
- Ramsland, Katherine (2013). The Devil's Dozen: 12 Notorious Serial Killers Caught by Cutting-Edge Forensics. Berkley Publishing Group. ISBN 978-0-425-27077-6.
- Tilstone, William J.; Savage, Kathleen A.; Clark, Leigh A. (2006). Forensic Science: An Encyclopedia of History, Methods, and Techniques. ABC-CLIO. ISBN 978-1-576-07194-6.
- Wilson, Colin (1995). A Plague of Murder: The Rise and Rise of Serial Killing in the Modern Age. Constable & Robinson Ltd. ISBN 978-1-854-87249-4.
- Wilson, Colin; Wilson, Damon (2006) The World's Most Evil Murderers: Real-Life Stories of Infamous Killers ISBN 978-1-405-48828-0
- Yount, Lisa (2007). Forensic Science: From Fibers to Fingerprints. Chelsea House Publishing. ISBN 978-1-604-13061-4.
