= Online employment screening test =

Recruitment screening tool

An online employment screening test (sometimes called a pre-employment test or online screening interview) is a part of the recruitment process. It is a type of employment testing that typically accompanies or follows a job application, while preceding a phone interview or formal job interview.

Employment screening tests are typically forms or questionnaires composed of test or interview-type questions. The questions may be multiple choice, yes/no, rank-order or open-ended. The questions are used to gauge job applicants’ knowledge, skills, attitudes and/or personality before conducting a phone screening or in-person interview.

Large employers like Walmart, McDonald's and Burger King use pre-employment tests. Some employers have taken to using these online quizzes in response to the growing number of applicants resulting from a weak economy. Some say they use the online screening tests to see if job seekers who have been out of work for a while are still able to perform certain skills.

== See also ==
- Real-time labor-market information
