= National Criminal Justice Officer Selection Inventory =

Examination for criminal justice officers

In the United States, vocations within the public safety sector, (i.e., firefighter, sheriff and police officer, correctional officer, emergency medical services including emergency medical technician) often require Industrial and Organizational Psychology employment testing for initial employment and advancement throughout the ranks. The National Criminal Justice Officer Selection Inventory – NCJOSI, is a national entry-level examination that was developed as an alternative to conventional criminal justice written entrance examinations. It was developed by IOS, Inc. or Industrial/Organizational Solutions Inc, referred to as IOS in the 2009 United States Supreme Court case, Ricci v. DeStefano. Psychological testing is a standard practice done by many criminal justice agencies throughout the United States.

The National Criminal Justice Officer Selection Inventory – NCJOSI, was designed specifically to predict success for criminal justice positions (i.e., police and deputy sheriff), and to be in strict compliance with all federal, state and local testing guidelines and regulations. The NCJOSI helps agencies select officers who will be successful working in departments that are either now using, or are moving toward, a community-oriented or problem-solving approach to public safety. This criminal justice philosophy requires that officers be both smarter and able to work with a diverse and demanding community. This exam was designed to provide both a cognitive (i.e., problem-solving) and a job-related attitude/behavioral-orientation (i.e., criminal justice officer orientation) component. The NCJOSI was psychometrically developed to maximize validity while minimizing adverse impact.

The National Criminal Justice Officer Selection Inventory, was designed to screen out rather large percentages of the applicant pool while displaying no evidence of adverse impact against protected classes of individuals. The exam also reduces failure rates on interviews, background checks, polygraph examinations, psychological evaluations, and other costly employment hurdles.
