= National Firefighter Selection Inventory =

Firefighting screening tool

In the United States, vocations within the public safety sector, (i.e., firefighter, sheriff and police officer, correctional officer, emergency medical services including emergency medical technicians), often require Industrial and Organizational Psychology employment testing for initial employment and advancement throughout the ranks. The National Firefighter Selection Inventory - NFSI, is a national entry-level examination that was developed as an alternative to conventional firefighter written entrance examinations. It was developed by IOS, Inc. or Industrial/Organizational Solutions Inc, referred to as IOS in the 2009 United States Supreme Court case, Ricci v. DeStefano. Psychological testing is a standard practice done by many fire departments throughout the United States.

The National Firefighter Selection Inventory - (NFSI), when used as a pre-employment screening tool, helps select qualified individuals for service as firefighters. A fundamental aspect of the NFSI is that its testing platform is an alternative to conventional firefighter written entrance examinations. Utilizing a comprehensive and compensatory model, the exam assesses not only individuals’ cognitive ability, but also their behavioral predispositions; job-related attitudes and motivation. The National Firefighter Selection Inventory displays no evidence of adverse impact against protected classes of individuals. This alternative testing model is well suited to predict success for all entry-level firefighter positions and to be in strict compliance with all federal, state and local testing guidelines and regulations.

Because NFSI scores contain both cognitive and behavioral orientation components, candidates who score at the top of the list have been shown through criterion-related validation studies to be more likely to be successful in additional hiring components. The exam reduces failure rates on interviews, background checks, polygraph examinations, psychological evaluations, and other costly employment hurdles., as well as success with on the job performance, than candidates ranked solely on the basis of a cognitive score.
