= Robin Hood Morality Test =

Psychological test

The Robin Hood Morality Test (or Quiz) is a simple psychology test. In the test, a situation is posed and the reader is asked to rank Robin Hood, Maid Marian, Little John and the Sheriff of Nottingham in terms of the morality of their actions in the scenario. There are 24 possible answers, for which extremely brief psychological summaries are provided.

The test is not regarded as a reliable diagnostic tool.

The test was allegedly written as a dinner ice-breaker by an Australian psychologist who was a marriage expert, and later refined.

== See also ==
- List of tests
- Personality test
