= Uhlenhuth test =

Test for source species of blood

The Uhlenhuth test, also referred to as the antigen–antibody precipitin test for species, is a test which can determine the species of a blood sample. It was invented by Paul Uhlenhuth in 1901, based on the discovery that the blood of different species had one or more characteristic proteins. The test represented a major breakthrough and came to have tremendous importance in forensic science in the 20th century. The test was further refined for forensic use by the Swiss chemist Maurice Müller in the 1960s.
