= Profile of mood states =

Profile of Mood States
- Purpose: used to assess transient, distinct mood states

The Profile of Mood States (POMS) is a psychological rating scale used to assess transient, distinct mood states. This scale was developed by McNair, Droppleman, and Lorr. Advantages of using this assessment include the simplicity of administration and ease of participant understanding. Another feature of the assessment that is notable is POMS psychological states can be assessed quickly due to the simplicity of the test. POMS can be administered and measured through written or online forums. The POMS measures six different dimensions of mood swings over a period of time. These include: Tension or Anxiety, Anger or Hostility, Vigor or Activity, Fatigue or Inertia, Depression or Dejection, Confusion or Bewilderment. A five-point scale ranging from "not at all" to "extremely" is administered by experimenters to patients to assess their mood states. There are two forms of the test; the long form that is administered primarily to adults and the short form which is primarily administered to adolescents. Completion of the assessment can take 5–15 minutes, depending on the form.

== History ==
In 1971, Douglas M. McNair along with Maurice Lorr and Leo F. Droppleman developed the first profile of mood states, which became the building block for being able to measure mood changes in people. With creating this scale, McNair and his colleagues came up with six distinct dimensions of mood swings that anyone can experience over time; Tension or Anxiety, Depression or Dejection, Anger or Hostility, Vigor or Activity, Fatigue or Inertia, and Confusion or Bewilderment. The first edition of the POMS scale is made up of 65 self-report questions where participants use a Likert scale to indicate whether each question related to them or not. This scale was the only in existence until 1983 when S. Shacham created the POMS-SF, a more concise version of McNair's original creation. Composed of only 37 questions, the shortened version still could produce significant results for participants while dramatically cutting down on the time it took to take the test. Recently there has been an updated edition created by McNair and Juvia P. Heurchert, the profile of mood states 2nd Edition (POMS 2). Like the original one created in 1971, this one also includes a short and long form of the test with 35 & 65 questions respectively.

POMS long form

The first edition of the profile of mood states scale is known as the POMS standard version or the POMS long form. It was developed by McNair, Lorr, and Doppleman in 1971 and is still in use today. Composed of 65 questions, those taking the test are asked to give a self-report for each question on how well they do or do not relate. Most of those who complete this test are adults and it takes approximately 5–15 minutes. With an extensive number of questions, the data that is collected from the test can provide the participants with data that is reliable and consistent. One of the drawbacks of the POMS long form scale is including too many questions. This can limit those who have a physical illness or some type of impairment that does not allow them to fully complete the test to the best of their ability.

POMS short form

The second edition of the profile of mood states scale is known as the POMS short form. POMS measures six different dimensions of mood swings over a period of time. These include: Tension or Anxiety, Anger or Hostility, Vigor or Activity, Fatigue or Inertia, Depression or Dejection, Confusion or Bewilderment. The short version of POMS was introduced in 1983 by S. Shacham, this version reduced the number of questions down to 37 from the original long form's 65. The short form still covers all aspects and accurately exhibits the mood states of those who took this form. The short form is considered to be a great alternative to the long form if a briefer measure of psychological distress is needed.

== See also ==
- Psychological testing
