= International Test Commission =

The International Test Commission (ITC) is an association of national psychological associations, test commissions, organizations and individuals, who promote "the proper development, evaluation and uses" of educational and psychological tests. The ITC is a non-profit organization, affiliated to the International Association of Applied Psychology (IAAP) and the International Union of Psychological Science (IUPsyS). The ITC stimulates international cooperation on research projects relevant to a scientifically and ethically sound use of tests. The ITC develops guidelines on the use of tests; holds a biennial international conference; publishes a peer-reviewed journal (International Journal of Testing) and a newsletter (Testing International).

== History ==
The founding of the ITC was due to the efforts of Jean Cardinet (Switzerland), who presented his concerns with the ethical use of psychological tests to the General Assembly of the Swiss Psychological Society in 1968. In 1971, the Swiss Professional Association of Applied Psychology published a set of regulations to promote the quality and prevent the abuse of tests. Cardinet initiated a project to create national test commissions in all countries using psychological tests. His idea was approved by the International Association of Applied Psychology (IAAP) in 1971; and by 1974, at least 15 national test commissions existed.

In 1975, an advisory council of the emerging ITC met to draft a constitution and agree on the first initiatives, including a public survey of test attitudes. The ITC was officially "born" in 1976, during the Congress of the International Union of Psychological Sciences (IUPsyS), where its constitution was provisionally approved.

The draft constitution defined two membership categories: (a) full members, consisting of national test commissions recognized by the psychological association in their respective country, and (b) affiliate members, who were either international associations with an interest in testing, or national associations from countries not full members of the ITC. The membership structure was amended several times: first in 1998, when affiliate membership was opened to any organization interested in testing (including test publishers or universities, who had not been accepted previously), and then in 2000, when the individual membership category was created.

Today, the ITC membership covers most European countries and North America, as well as some countries in the Middle and Far East, South America and Africa.

== Initiatives of ITC ==
=== International Journal of Testing ===
The International Journal of Testing (IJT) is the official journal of the ITC published since 1999 by Routledge (now Taylor & Francis Group). There are four issues per year. The IJT publishes original articles discussing theoretical issues, methodological approaches, and empirical research in the area of tests and testing.

=== Best practice guidelines ===
Having no policy enforcement powers for the standards in psychological testing at national levels, the ITC promotes good practice in test construction and use through the development of best practice guidelines. To date, the ITC has published the following guidelines:

1. ITC Guidelines on Adapting Tests (1st Edition; 2nd Edition)
2. ITC Guidelines on Test Use
3. ITC Guidelines on Computer-Based and Internet-delivered Testing
4. ITC Guidelines on Quality Control in Scoring, Test Analysis and Reporting of Test Scores
5. ITC Guidelines on the Security of Tests, Examinations, and Other Assessments
6. ITC Guidelines on Practitioner Use of Test Revisions, Obsolete Tests, and Test Disposal
7. ITC Guidelines for the Large-Scale Assessment of Linguistically and Culturally Diverse Populations

The guidelines may be downloaded in English and various other languages from the ITC website.

=== Testing International – the ITC newsletter ===
The newsletter Testing International disseminates information of international relevance to the ITC membership twice a year. Past editions are available to the public from the ITC website.

=== ITC conferences ===
The ITC organizes a biannual scientific conference, which usually brings together around 400-500 delegates from around 40 countries. The details of the past and the forthcoming meetings are announced on the ITC website.
