= Real-time labor-market information =

Real-time labor-market information (LMI) is the generation of data on labor demand from open Internet sources. Real-time feeds give an immediate view into conditions that trades precision for currency. Because real-time labor market information is scraped from employer, industry organizations, recruiters and job boards and interpreted using natural language text interpretation, it is intrinsically subject to mis-identifications, missed information, and duplications. Nevertheless, real-time LMI has become one of the primary sources of data for researchers, corporate HR, and workforce agencies (for example, the Texas Workforce Commission) because:

- Analysis based on a near complete population of jobs
- Data that is highly indicative of current conditions across broad geographic, industry, and skill segments

== See also ==
- Online employment screening test
