= Uhlenhuth Research Laboratory of the University of Freiburg =

German research institute

Coordinates: 48°00′10″N 7°50′52″E

The Uhlenhuth Research Laboratory of the University of Freiburg, originally known as the State Research Laboratory (German: Staatliches Forschungslaboratorium), was a research institute in the field of medical microbiology and infectious diseases in Freiburg, Germany. It was established in 1936 with funding from the German Research Council for the microbiologist and immunologist Paul Uhlenhuth to provide a platform for his continued research after he had retired from his university chair at the University of Freiburg, and Uhlenhuth served as the institute's director until his death in 1957 at the age of 87. The scientific staff consisted of Uhlenhuth and a small number of researchers. As the name suggests, it was a state institute in the Republic of Baden and later in Baden-Württemberg. It was originally an independent research institution, albeit closely associated with the University of Freiburg, but in the early 1950s, the institute formally became part of the Faculty of Medicine at the University of Freiburg. After Uhlenhuth's death, it was integrated in the Institute of Medical Microbiology and Hygiene.

The institute was located in Hebelstraße 42 in central Freiburg, in the same building as the university's Institute of Medical Microbiology and Hygiene, and within the central university campus area.
