= Student Adaptation to College Questionnaire =

The Student Adaptation to College Questionnaire (abbreviated SACQ) is a 67-item self-report inventory designed by Robert W. Baker and Bohdan Siryk and published by Western Psychological Services in 1987 (manual published 1989). The questionnaire is proprietary and copies of the questionnaire as well as the manual can be purchased from the WPS website.

== History ==
In a 1984 paper, Baker and Siryk described the results of a 52-item self-report inventory that used a Likert scale. They had administered this inventory to 734 students, and their paper discussed the reliability and validity of the data thus obtained. This would later grow into the Student Adaptation to Colleges Questionnaire.

== Description of the questionnaire ==
The questionnaire is a 67-item self-report inventory that assesses overall adjustment to college, as well as adjustment in four specific areas:

- Academic adjustment
- Personal-emotional adjustment
- Social adjustment
- Attachment (to the institution)

The authors claim that if the questionnaire is used at the time people enter college, it can be used for the early detection of potential adjustment problems and can increase the retention of students who might otherwise drop out.

== Reception ==
=== Academic research ===
There is some academic research that relies on the SACQ and judges its usefulness. A 1992 paper by Krotseng used discriminant analysis to determine "(1) the extent to which the SACQ accurately predicts student departure for a private, comprehensive university; (2) SACQ items distinguishing nonpersisters; (3) use with an incoming class; and (4) evidence linking the SACQ with intervention strategies." Another 1992 paper by Dahmus, Bernardin, and Bernardin discussed the SACQ's potential.

A 1994 study by Gerdes and Mallinckrodt used SACQ data to measure the emotional, social, and academic adjustment of college students.

A 2002 paper by Beyers and Goossens from the Catholic University of Leuven considered the applicability of the SACQ to Europe and concluded: "With some reservations regarding the Academic Adjustment subscale, then, the SACQ seems to be a useful tool for research on university life among college students in Europe."

The abstract of a 2012 meta-analysis by Credé and Niehorster (k = 237, N = 44,668) reads: "The review, based on studies using the Student Adaptation to College Questionnaire, is organized around three primary themes: (1) the structure of students’ adjustment to college, (2) the relationship of adjustment to college constructs with possible antecedents and correlates, and (3) the relationship of adjustment to college constructs with college grades and college retention. Meta-analytic results indicate that adjustment to college is multidimensional, predictive of college grades, and an unusually good predictor of college retention. Adjustment to college is also shown to be moderately related to individual traits, social support, and students’ relationships with their parents. Weaker relationships are evident with demographic variables, prior achievement, coping approaches, and variables that reflect students’ psychological independence from their parents. Theoretical and practical implications for the study of students’ adjustment to college, academic performance, and retention are discussed."
