= Sokanu Interests, Personality, and Preferences Inventory =

The Sokanu Interests, Personality, and Preferences Inventory (SIPPI) is a psychological inventory used in career counseling and employee selection. Scales are based on O*Net content domains developed by the US Department of Labor, with the addition of basic interest scales based on the model developed by Day and Rounds. The inventory measures 186 user traits across 8 domains: personality, needs, skills preferences, abilities preferences, work context, organizational culture, Holland Codes, and basic interests. Completing the full set of available materials (510 items) takes an average of 35.4 minutes.

== Domains and Scales ==
Personality (Work Styles)	Needs (Work Values)	Holland Codes	Organizational Culture	Can't Stands (Work Context)	Skills Preferences	Abilities Preferences	Basic Interests
Achievement/Effort; Persistence; Initiative; Leadership; Cooperation; Concern for Others; Social Orientation; Self Control; Adaptability/Flexibility; Dependability; Attention to Detail; Integrity; Independence; Innovation; Analytical Thinking; Stress Tolerance; Acceptance of Criticism	Need for Ability Utilization; Need for Achievement; Need for Advancement; Need for Recognition; Need for Authority; Need for Social Status; Need for Creativity; Need for Responsibility; Need for Autonomy; Need for Pleasant Co-workers; Need to Uphold Moral Values; Need to Provide Social Service; Need for Supportive Company Policies and Practices; Need for Supportive Supervisors; Need to Keep Busy; Need for Compensation; Need for Independence; Need for Security; Need for Variety; Need for Working Conditions	Realistic; Investigative; Artistic; Social; Enterprising; Conventional	Taking chances; Fairness / Justice; Precision; Self-control; Getting things done; Caring about employees; Innovation; Aggressiveness; Valuing customers; Providing high quality products or services; Openness and honesty; Flexibility / adapting to change	Public speaking; Dealing with customers; Coordinating or leading others; Being responsible for people's health and safety; Being responsible for results of other workers; Dealing with angry or rude people; Dealing with physically aggressive people; Working indoors all the time; Working outdoors exposed to all weather conditions; Driving a car or truck many hours a day; Working in extreme temperatures; Cramped work spaces requiring awkward positions; Exposure to heights; Dangerous work environment; Sitting most of the time; Standing most of the time; Kneeling or crawling; Repetitive motions; Frequent decision-making; Constant competition; Time pressure to meet strict deadlines; Unpredictable work schedules; Working more than 40 hours a week	Reading; Active Listening; Writing; Speaking; Mathematics; Science; Critical Thinking; Active Learning; Monitoring; Judgment and Decision Making; Time Management; Management of Financial Resources; Management of Material Resources; Management of Personnel Resources; Social Perceptiveness; Coordination; Service Orientation; Negotiation; Persuasion; Instructing; Technology Design; Equipment Selection; Installation; Programming; Operation Monitoring; Operation and Control; Equipment Maintenance; Troubleshooting; Repairing; Quality Control Analysis	Originality; Problem Sensitivity; Deductive Reasoning; Inductive Reasoning; Memorization; Spatial Orientation; Visualization; Selective Attention; Time Sharing; Manual Dexterity; Finger Dexterity; Reaction Time; Physical Strength Abilities; Stamina; Extent Flexibility; Gross Body Coordination	Adventure; Animals; Athletics; Beauty & Style; Business; Counseling and helping; Creative arts; Creative writing & journalism; Culinary arts; Engineering; Family activity; Finance; Flying; Green industry; Healthcare service; Human relations management; Information technology; Inspecting; Law; Life science; Management; Manual labor; Mathematics; Military; Nature and agriculture; Office clerical work; Performing arts; Personal service; Physical science; Politics; Professional advising; Protective services; Religion & spirituality; Sailing; Sales; Skilled trades; Social sciences; Teaching; Technical writing

== History ==
First published in October 2013, the SIPPI was developed by Rhys Lewis, Ph.D. and published by Sokanu Interactive. An early version of scales for Holland Codes and Basic interests used items published by the open source Interest Item Pool project. Computer adaptive versions of the personality and interest scales are currently under development. Validation studies are currently being conducted to establish concurrent validity with other popular assessments and job behaviors.

== Reliability ==
Average internal consistency reliability of the multi-item scales on SIPPI is α = .88. Minimum internal consistency for any scale is α = .82.
