= Edwin E. Wagner =

American psychologist (born 1930)

Edwin E. Wagner is the principal proponent and author of "The Hand Test". Wagner has written over 200 publications in psychology including manuals, reviews, monographs, books and journal articles.

Born in 1930 in Philadelphia, Pennsylvania, he received a B.A. in psychology (summa cum laude) (1956), M.A. in psychology (1957) and Ph.D. in psychology (1959) all from Temple University. Wagner's academic appointments include instructor at Pennsylvania State University and Temple University, professor emeritus at University of Akron, and Dean at Forest Institute of Professional Psychology in Huntsville, Alabama.

== The Hand Test ==
The Hand Test is a projective technique that uses ten unbound 3.5 x 4.5 inch cards, nine with simple line drawings of single hands and one blank card, to measure how the viewer interprets what each hand is doing (the blank card is left to the imagination of viewer). Verbal responses are given or "projected" by the viewer, and the results are recorded, scored and interpreted by the administrator. Wagner presented the Hand Test as a "starting point" or "narrow band" instrument that "does not necessarily measure all major aspects of personality but does assess the individual's behavioral tendencies." (Wagner, 1983).

== Publications ==
=== Books ===
- Edwin E. Wagner. The Hand Test, Revised ed. 1983: Manual. Los Angeles: Western Psychological Services.
- Glenn R. Young and Edwin E. Wagner. The Hand Test : advances in application and research. Malabar, Fla. : Krieger Pub. Co., 1999. ISBN 1-57524-055-6
  - Review: by Petersorn CA, Journal of Personality Assessment 76 (1): 185-188 Feb 2001
- Paul E. Panek and Edwin E. Wagner, The use of the Hand test with older adults", Springfield, Ill., U.S.A. : Thomas, c1985. ISBN 0-398-05111-9
- Edwin E. Wagner and Carol F. Wagner, The interpretation of projective test data : theoretical and practical guidelines, Springfield, Illinois, U.S.A. : C.C. Thomas, c1981. ISBN 0-398-04602-6

=== Articles ===
The three most highly cited among his over 100 peer-reviewed articles are

- Wagner, EE & Heise, MR, "Comparison of Rorschach Records of 3 Multiple Personalities", Journal of Personality Assessment 38 (4): 308-331 1974 (cited 45 times)
- Wagner, EE, "Structural Analysis: Theory of Personality Based or Projective Testing", Journal of Personality Assessment 35 (5): 422-435 1971 (cited 34 times)
- Coursol, A & Wagner, EE, "Effect of positive Findings of Submission and Acceptance Rates: a Note on Metaanalysis Bias" Professional Psychology: Research and practice 17 (2): 136-137 Apr 1986 (cited 32 times)
