= Tennessee Self-Concept Scale =

Psychological measure

The Tennessee Self-Concept Scale is a self-concept measure developed by William H. Fitts in 1965. An updated version, the TSCS-2 has been published by Western Psychological Services since 1996.
