= True Colors (personality) =

Personality profiling system

- Purpose: Personality psychology
- Year started: 1978
- Website: truecolorsintl.com

True Colors is a personality profiling system created by Don Lowry in 1978. It was originally designed to categorize at-risk youth into four basic learning styles using the colors blue, orange, gold, and green to identify the strengths and challenges of these personality types.

== Personality profiling system ==
According to the True Colors temperament theory, which its proponents describe as a refined version of the Myers–Briggs Type Indicator (MBTI), everyone's personality consists of a combination of all four colors, with the two dominant colors representing the core of a person's temperament. In general, green personality types are characterized as independent thinkers, gold types as pragmatic planners, orange types as action-oriented, and blue types as people-oriented. The system does not assign individuals to a single personality type, instead recognizing that personality may shift based on environment or social context. True Colors is intended to help users understand the behaviors and motivations of others relative to their own personalities, with the goal of mitigating potential conflict through recognition of personality differences.

=== Scientific basis ===
A 2006 study by Whichard examined the convergent validity of the True Colors system with several established personality and interest inventories. Convergent validity refers to the degree to which a measure correlates with measures of similar constructs. The study found that True Colors demonstrated convergent validity with the MBTI, but not with the Strong Interest Inventory (SII) or the Campbell Interest and Skill Survey (CISS). Subjects who were retested after a 30-to-50-day delay received the same classification approximately 95% of the time, and rated the system's predictions about them as accurate.

The study has several noted limitations: the researcher was an 11-year True Colors Certified Trainer, the study was not published in a peer-reviewed journal, and no independent replications have been published.
