= Depression Anxiety Stress Scales =

Self-report mood disorder questionnaire

The Depression Anxiety Stress Scales (DASS) are a set of three self-report questionnaires with a total of 42 items. Each question is rated on a four-point Likert scale of either frequency or severity of the participants' experiences over the last week to emphasize states over traits. These scores ranged from zero, meaning that the client believed the item "did not apply to them at all", to four, meaning that the client considered the item to "apply to them very much or most of the time". It is also stressed in the instructions that there are no right or wrong answers.

== Scales ==
The sum of the relevant 14 items for each scale constitute the participants' scores for each of Depression, Anxiety, and Stress, including items such as "I couldn't seem to experience any positive feeling at all", "I was aware of the dryness of my mouth" and "I found it hard to wind down" in the respective order of the scales. The order of the 42 items has been randomized so that items of the same scale are not clustered together. Each of the scales is then broken down into subscales comprising two to five items each.

The Depression scale has subscales assessing dysphoria, hopelessness, devaluation of life, self-deprecation, lack of interest/involvement, anhedonia, and inertia.

The Anxiety scale assesses autonomic arousal, skeletal muscle effects, situational anxiety, and subjective experience of anxious affect.

The Stress scale's subscales highlight levels of non-chronic arousal through difficulty relaxing, nervous arousal, and being easily upset/agitated, irritable/over-reactive, and impatient.

== Purpose ==
The main purpose of the DASS is to isolate and identify aspects of emotional disturbance, for example, to assess the degree of severity of the core symptoms of depression, anxiety, or stress. The initial aims of the scale's constructions were to define the full range of core symptoms of depression and anxiety, meet rigorous standards of psychometric adequacy, and develop maximum discrimination between the depression anxiety scales. While the DASS can be administered and scored by individuals without psychology qualifications, it is recommended that the interpretation and decisions based on results are made by an experienced clinician in combination with other forms of assessment.

== Development ==
The Depression, Anxiety, and Stress Scales were developed by researchers at the University of New South Wales (Australia).

The test was developed using a sample of responses from the comparison of 504 sets of results from a trial by students, taken from a larger sample of 950 first-year university student responses. The test was then normed on a sample of 1044 men and 1870 women aged between 17 and 69 years, across participants of varying backgrounds, including university students, nurses in training, and blue and white collared employees of a major airline, bank, railway workshop, and naval dockyard. The scores were subsequently checked for validity against outpatient groups, including patients with anxiety and depressive disorders, myocardial infarction patients, patients with insomnia, as well as patients undergoing treatment for sexual, menopausal, and depressive disorders. While the test was not normed against samples younger than 17, due to the simplicity of language, there has been no compelling evidence against the use of the scales for comparison against children as young as 12. The reliability scores of the scales in terms of Cronbach's alpha scores rate the Depression scale at 0.91, the Anxiety scale at 0.84, and the Stress scale at 0.90 in the normative sample. The means and standard deviations for each scale are 6.34 and 6.97 for depression, 4.7 and 4.91 for anxiety, and 10.11 and 7.91 for stress, respectively. The mean scores in the normative sample did vary slightly between genders as well as varying by age, though the threshold scores for classifications do not change by these variations. The Depression and Stress scales meet the standard threshold requirement of 0.9 for research; however, the Anxiety scale still meets the 0.7 thresholds for clinical applications and is still close to the 0.9 required for research.

== See also ==
- Psychological testing
