= Purdue Spatial Visualization Test: Visualization of Rotations =

Test of spatial visualization ability

The Purdue Spatial Visualization Test-Visualization of Rotations (PSVT:R) is a test of spatial visualization ability published by Roland B. Guay in 1977. Many modifications of the test exist.

The test consists of thirty questions of increasing difficulty, the standard time limit is 20 minutes.

Like most measures of spatial ability, the PSVT:R shows sex differences. A meta-analysis of 40 studies found a Hedges's g of 0.57 in favor of males.
