= Employment integrity testing =

Form of pre-employment screening

The honesty or integrity of individuals can be tested via pre-employment screening from employers. Employers may administer personnel selection tests within the scope of background checks that are used to assess the likelihood that behavior. Integrity tests are administered to assess whether the honesty of the potential candidate is acceptable in respect to theft and counterproductive work behavior. These tests may have an impact on the final personnel decisions.

There are two types of test related to integrity testing, overt and personality-based measures. The overt test asks about past behavior and attitudes about theft and counterproductive behavior. The personality-based measures of personality traits that are associated with theft and counterproductive behavior.

Integrity testing for employment selection became popular during the 1980s. Human resources personnel found that integrity tests were an improvement over polygraph tests. Polygraph tests were no longer able to be used for screening of most future employees in the United States due to the Employee Polygraph Protection Act of 1988 (EPPA).

== Types ==
Integrity tests in the past used self-report paper and pencil formats. Modern tests include at least one measurement of psychophysiological parameter like voice analysis, to ensure higher reliability. Integrity tests are designed to assess honesty, dependability, trustworthiness, conscientiousness, and reliability. Integrity tests were created to foresee counterproductive work behavior while on the job and employee theft.

=== Overt ===
An overt integrity test is a self-report paper and pencil test that asks a subject directly about their honesty, criminal history, attitudes towards drug use, thefts by other people, and general questions that show integrity. It is designed to find "undesirable" traits in a person's behavior, past crimes, and dishonesty, in order to sort out potential candidates. Overt tests are often split into two sections. The first being a series of questions evaluating the subject's attitude towards theft, their beliefs on the frequency of theft, punishment of theft and the assessment of the subject's own honesty. The attitude section also assess their own trustworthiness in the workforce. Typical questions might ask if people believe that everyone can be dishonest or the question might as how honest the test taker is. The second section asks the subject what type and amount of theft and/or counter-productive behavior they have been a part of with past employers or any other illegal behaviors. Typical questions for this section might ask if someone has thought about stealing something or what amount the test taker has stolen from past employers.

Examples of overt integrity test are: London House Personnel Selection (PSI), the Reid Report, the Stanton Survey, and the Phase II Profile. The Reid Report evaluates social behavior, substance use, work background, optimism, persistence, influence, valuing of interpersonal relationships, self-restraint, willingness to help others with tasks. The Stanton Survey helps identify if a person will steal merchandise, misuse sick days, break company policy, and give unauthorized discounts, counterproductive behaviors.

=== Personality-oriented ===
Personality-oriented tests include items that assess personality characteristics that have been shown to relate to counterproductive work behavior. The test items assess dependability, social conformity, thrill seeking, and conscientiousness. Conscientiousness seems to be the biggest personality predictor from the Big Five personality traits that help to predict personality with relation to employment. An example of typical questions might ask if you are more sensible or adventurous.

Examples of personality-oriented integrity test are the Personnel reaction blank, employment inventory from personnel decisions Inc., and the Hogan personality inventory. The personnel reaction blank is based on California psychological inventory. It tests for sociability, dependability, conscientiousness, interval values, self-restraint, and acceptance of convention. employment inventory from personnel decisions Inc. was designed to measure employee deviance. Specifically measure for trouble with authority, thrill seeking, hostility, irresponsibility, and socialization. The Hogan personality inventory evaluates hostility towards authority, thrill seeking, conscientiousness, confused vocational identity, and social insensitivity.

== Psychological/work-selection tests ==
Integrity tests aim to identify prospective employees who are likely to engage in theft or counterproductive work behavior. Identifying unsuitable candidates can save the employer from problems that might otherwise arise during their term of employment. Integrity tests make certain assumptions, specifically:

- that persons who have "low integrity" report more dishonest behavior
- that persons who have "low integrity" try to find reasons in order to justify such behavior
- that persons who have "low integrity" think others more likely to commit crimes — like theft, for example. (Since people seldom sincerely declare to a prospective employers their past deviance, the "integrity" testers adopted an indirect approach: letting the work-candidates talk about what they think of the deviance of other people, considered in general, as a written answer demanded by the questions of the "integrity test".)
- that persons who have "low integrity" exhibit impulsive behavior
- that persons who have "low integrity" tend to think that society should severely punish deviant behavior (Specifically, "integrity tests" assume that people who have a history of deviance report within such tests that they support harsher measures applied to the deviance exhibited by other people.) The claim of such tests to be able to detect "fake" answers plays a crucial role in detecting people who have low integrity. Naive respondents really believe this pretense and behave accordingly, reporting some of their past deviance and their thoughts about the deviance of others, fearing that if they do not answer truthfully their untrue answers will reveal their "low integrity". These respondents believe that the more candid they are in their answers, the higher their "integrity score" will be.

In various industries, websites and businesses provide resources related to integrity testing and its role in employment selection. For example, Adam-Milo offers detailed articles explaining integrity and reliability tests, their importance, and how they are used in assessing job candidates' suitability. These resources help employers understand the impact of such tests in predicting job performance and behavior.

== Validity ==
Integrity tests should be validated before they are used to select people into jobs. Generally this is done by showing that scores on the test correlate with employee stealing or engaging in counterproductive behavior.

== Criticisms ==
Critics of integrity testing think 1) it is unfair to avoid hiring someone because they have a predisposition to do something that they might never do, 2) integrity tests can violate legal and ethical privacy standards, because some questions may not be related to specific duties of the job, and there is no protection for the illegal use of the data, 3) integrity tests would have adverse impact of screening out a higher proportion of minority group members, 4) if a client learns of their own score, it may have an adverse effect on their morale, but even if the scores were only shown to the employers, it could affect the employers attitude towards the employee which could hurt the effectiveness of the employee.
