= Objective test =

Objective tests are measures in which responses maximize objectivity, in the sense that response options are structured such that examinees have only a limited set of options (e.g. Likert scale, true or false). Structuring a measure in this way is intended to minimize subjectivity or bias on the part of the individual administering the measure so that administering and interpreting the results does not rely on the judgment of the examiner.

Although the term ‘objective test’ encompasses a wide range of tests with which most people are somewhat familiar (i.e. Wechsler Adult Intelligence Scale, Minnesota Multiphasic Personality Inventory, Graduate Record Examination, and the Standardized Achievement Test), it is a term that arose out of the field of personality assessment, as a response and contrast to the growing popularity of tests known as projective tests. These ‘projective tests’ require examinees to generate unstructured responses to ambiguous tasks or activities, the content of which is supposed to represent their personal characteristics (e.g. internal attitudes, personality traits).

However, the distinction between objective and projective testing is deceptive since it indicates that objective tests are immune to bias. Although the fixed response style of objective tests does not require interpretation on the part of the examiner during the administration and scoring of the measure, responses to questions are subject to the examinee's own response style and biases, in much the same way they are for projective measures; therefore, both test ‘types’ are vulnerable to subjective factors that may affect scores. Furthermore, understanding and giving meaning to the results of any assessment, projective and objective alike, is done within the context of an examinee's personal history, presenting concerns, and the myriad of factors that can affect examinee's scores on the assessment. Thus, both objective and projective tests carry potential sources of bias and require judgment in interpretation to varying degrees. Instead of categorizing tests based on overt but superficial test qualities, the merits of a particular usage of test scores should be assessed.

== See also ==
- Employment testing
