= Precipitin =

Antibody from antigen binding

A precipitin is an antibody which can precipitate out of a solution upon antigen binding.

== Precipitin reaction ==
The precipitin reaction provided the first quantitative assay for antibody. The precipitin reaction is based upon the interaction of antigen with antibody leading to the production of antigen-antibody complexes.

To produce a precipitin reaction, varying amounts of soluble antigen are added to a fixed amount of serum containing antibody. As the amount of antigen added:

- In the zone of antibody excess, each molecule of antigen is bound extensively by antibody and crosslinked to other molecules of antigen. The average size of antibody-antigen complex is small; cross-linking between antigen molecules by antibody is rare.
- In the zone of equivalence, the formation of precipitin complexes is optimal. Extensive lattices of antigen and antibody are formed by cross-linking.
- At high concentrations of antigen, the average size of antibody-antigen complexes is once again small because few antibody molecules are available to cross-link antigen molecules together.

The small, soluble immune complexes formed in vivo in the zone of antigen excess can cause a variety of pathological syndromes.

Antibody can only precipitate antigenic substrates that are multivalent—that is, only antigens that have multiple antibody-binding sites epitopes. This allows for the formation of large antigen:antibody complexes.

== Medical diagnosis using precipitin tests ==
Infectious disease diagnosis

Precipitin assays are commonly used in the diagnosis of infectious diseases caused by bacteria, viruses, fungi, and parasites. By detecting the presence of pathogen-specific antigens in patient samples, healthcare professionals can identify the causing agent of an infection and initiate appropriate treatment. For example, precipitin tests can be used to detect antigens of infectious bronchitis caused by the infectious bronchitis virus (IBV).

Allergy testing

Precipitin assays are used in allergy testing to identify allergen-specific antibodies (IgE) in patient serum samples. By exposing the serum to a panel of common allergens, such as pollen, dust mites, pet dander, and food proteins, healthcare professionals can determine the specific allergens triggering an individual's allergic reactions.
