= Employment testing =

Employment testing is the practice of administering written, oral, or other tests as a means of determining the suitability or desirability of a job applicant. The premise is that if scores on a test correlate with job performance, then it is economically useful for the employer to select employees based on scores from that test.

== Legal context (United States) ==
The United States Supreme Court has decided several cases clarifying the place of employment testing in the context of discrimination law. In particular, these cases have addressed the discriminatory use of tests when promoting employees by requiring tests beyond the education required for the job. A central finding in Griggs v. Duke Power Co. was that the employer must demonstrate (or be prepared to demonstrate) that its selection process is related to the job being filled.

== Test types ==
Different types of assessments may be used for employment testing, including personality tests, intelligence tests, work samples, and assessment centers. Some correlate better with job performance than with others; employers may use more than one.

=== Performance assessment tests ===
Performance-based assessment testing is a process to find out if applicants can do the job for which they are applying. It is done through tests, which are directly administered and judged by hiring managers who will be supervising the potential hire.

The tests are peer-to-peer and reflect real business tasks that candidates have to perform, should they be selected for the role. The tests are open ended, time bound, business related questions which applicants need to submit their responses for in order to prove their abilities.

=== Personality tests ===
Some employers select staff using personality tests.

Researchers have tested the commonly used Big Five personality traits (openness, conscientiousness, extraversion, agreeableness, neuroticism). Conscientiousness positively correlates with job performance for all occupations, as found by meta analyses; an analysis of 36 studies found the same for conscientiousness but also for neuroticism.

However, other factors of personality can correlate with non-traditional aspects of job performance, such as leadership and effectiveness in a team environment. The Myers-Briggs Type Indicator (MBTI) is also used.

The Great Eight is a proposed model of competencies. An analysis of 29 studies found personality tests that suggest an employee had a particular 'great eight' competency were positively correlated with their actual performance in that competency.

The Minnesota Multiphasic Personality Inventory (MMPI) is a highly validated psychopathology test that is generally used in a clinical psychology setting and may reveal potential mental health disorders. However, this can be considered by the Equal Employment Opportunity Commission as the employer having knowledge of a medical condition prior to an offer of employment. This is an illegal basis for a hiring decision in the United States. Employers considering personality tests should focus on tests designed for job purposes and do not provide any information regarding an applicant's mental health or stability.

Notable situations in which the MMPI may be used are in final selection for police officers, fire fighters, and other security and emergency personnel, especially when the employees are required to carry weapons. An assessment of mental stability and fitness can be reasonably related and necessary in the performance of the job.

Employment integrity testing is used to determine an applicant's honesty and integrity. A large meta-analysis found relatively strong correlations between integrity tests and job performance.

Candidates may lie on personality tests in order to improve their chances of being selected, as found an analysis of 33 studies; though it is argued that assessors should see lying in this case as a good thing for being socially adaptive.

=== General and cognitive ability tests ===
Tests of cognitive ability can assess general intelligence and correlate very highly with overall job performance. Individuals with higher levels of cognitive ability tend to perform better on their jobs. This is especially true for jobs that are particularly intellectually demanding.

A large meta-analysis of a range of different tests found its strongest positive correlations to job performance from tests of general mental ability.

A study of 12 companies found scores for mathematics were associated with improved employee retention after 12 months, but not for scores of other measures including locating information, observing, reading, etc.

=== Job-knowledge tests ===
Employers administer job-knowledge tests when applicants must already possess a body of knowledge before being hired. Job-knowledge tests are particularly useful when applicants must have specialized or technical knowledge that can only be acquired through extensive experience or training. Job-knowledge tests are commonly used in fields such as computer programming, law, financial management, and electrical or mechanical maintenance.

Licensing exams and certification programs are also types of job-knowledge tests. Passing such exams indicates competence in the exam's subject area. Tests must be representative of the tested field, otherwise, litigation can be brought against the test-giver.

=== Situational judgment tests ===
Situational judgment tests are commonly used as employee-selection and employee-screening tools and have been developed to predict employment success. These tests present realistic hypothetical scenarios in a multiple-choice format. Applicants are asked to state what they would do in a difficult job-related situation.

Situational judgment tests measure the suitability of job applicants by assessing attributes such as problem solving, service orientation, and striving for achievement.

== Limitations ==
Much of the research done on such tests is correlational. Psychology research typically sets a relatively low threshold when deciding if a correlation is strong or weak. Many follow a precedent of 50% being a strong correlation - though results are rarely even that high - when outside of psychology a strong correlation is often said to be above 80%. Correlational work brings other issues. It may indicate employees with strong test scores perform better on their job but not how much better. Also correlation does not imply causation.

Researchers have raised concerns that potential candidates may see a given testing method as a negative reflection on the company. This may dissuade them from applying, depriving the company of good candidates, and they may tell others of their negative experience, hurting the company's reputation.

== See also ==
- Civil Rights Act of 1964
- Industrial and organizational psychology
- Objective test
- Projective test
- Psychological testing
- Situational judgement test
- Watson v. Fort Worth Bank & Trust, 487 U.S. 977 (1988)
- Wards Cove Packing Co. v. Atonio, 490 U.S. 642, 657 (1989)
