= Constituent Voice =

Constituent Voice is a performance management and measurement method designed as a continual improvement process developed by Keystone Accountability to enable organisations addressing social issues to improve their results by improving relationships with their constituents. Like customer satisfaction measurement, which it draws from, Constituent Voice treats measurement as an aspect of an intervention that not only provides metrics but contributes directly to outcomes by increasing the engagement of intended beneficiaries.

== History ==
Based on four years of field research, from 2008 it was introduced as Constituency Voice. The organization that led the field trials, Keystone Accountability, published the first technical note describing the method, now called Constituent Voice, in 2013. A revision of the original technical note was published in September 2014. Keystone sought and received a trademark for Constituent Voice in the United States in 2013. It became a registered mark in 2020. Constituent Voice® is licensed under the Creative Commons Attribution-ShareAlike 4.0 International license.

Constituent Voice blends two important lines of thought in development.

The main theoretical influence comes from Amartya Sen and Jean Drèze, who locate individual human ‘agency’ at the heart of development. Sen’s great synthesis work, Development as Freedom, concludes that development cannot be reduced to material well-being. Development is best understood as a package of overlapping political and economic mechanisms that progressively enable the exercise of freedoms that allow people to meet their basic needs and in other ways set the courses of their lives.

The other intellectual debt acknowledged by Constituent Voice literature is to the work of Albert O. Hirschman on the nature of choice under limited choice conditions. Hirschman observed that when faced with unsatisfactory performance from an organisation, people might decide not to exit but to ante up – to engage to improve the organisation. Hirschman called this Voice.

Constituent Voice metrics track Voice and Agency (among other things) and show how they can become essential assets for development service providers. A core claim of the Constituent Voice method is that its “relationship metrics” can be refined to accurately predict social outcomes, thereby providing real-time indicators that organisations can manage to in order to improve their performance and results.

A growing number of US national and international organisations are promoting Constituent Voice. The world’s largest charity rating agency, Charity Navigator, incorporated Constituent Voice into its 2013 revision of its rating system, Results Reporting. Specifically citing Constituent Voice, the influential annual trends forecast by Lucy Bernholz, Philanthropy and Social Economy: Blueprint 2014, highlights “constituent feedback” as a key trend going forward. The global business management consulting firm, McKinsey and Company, cited Constituent Voice as number one of five “best practices” for foundations seeking to “make assessment work”. Ground Truth Solutions, which emerged from Keystone as the leading promoter of Constituent Voice in the domain of humanitarian action, has deeply influenced the Core Humanitarian Standard. Responding to Keystone Accountability, the United States Congress adopted legislation in January 2014, and then further provisions over the next two years, requiring the State Department to report to Congress what the beneficiaries of American aid think about that aid. Similarly, following two years of sustained lobbying by Keystone, the World Bank also adopted a mandatory requirement in 2014 to collect and report "beneficiary feedback for all World Bank funded projects for which there are identifiable beneficiaries". Also in 2014, a number of US foundations formed a collective fund to spread Constituent Voice, The Fund for Shared Insight.

== Overview of method ==
Constituent Voice is akin to other recent innovations in measurement and project evaluation systems such as Outcome mapping, Utilisation-Focused Evaluation, and Most significant change technique in that it values measurement for its usefulness. It complements these and related approaches in its focus on measuring relationship quality – especially relationships with the intended beneficiaries – and using these metrics to drive change in organisational practice.

When asked in 2011 to explain why he championed Constituent Voice, the President of Oxfam America Ray Offenheiser, said “At its heart, Constituent Voice method promises to shift the very power to define ‘success’, and to declare when it has been achieved, into the hands of those that development organisations claim to serve. This shift toward greater agency is essential if we are to make development more effective.”

Constituent Voice method has five steps, all of which must be completed.

- Design

Designing feedback systems involves balancing four principles: (1) Rigour; (2) Sensitivity to Process and Culture; (3) Cost and (4) Utility. Oftentimes statistical rigour is elevated as a “gold standard” in surveys, but Constituent Voice emphasises that failing to account for sensitivity, cost, and utility are equally important ingredients in the effectiveness of a feedback system.

- Collect

For Constituent Voice, administering surveys is not simply about getting answers to questions; it’s about building a relationship with constituents so that they feel respected, consulted, and engaged in the process. As such, data collection begins by explaining the survey’s intended purpose so respondents understand the intentions, goals, and implications of their participation.

Constituent Voice uses a combination of continuous micro-surveys and periodic, high-quality, in-depth research.

- Analyse

Constituent Voice uses descriptive statistics to develop clear and visually powerful data reports.

Typically Constituent Voice analysis segments respondents based on individual characteristics and survey response (like Net Promoter), to make it easier to use the analysis to develop corrective actions and strategies. In particular, you can identify course corrections that fit with different segments of an organisation’s constituents, including non-respondents.

Constituent Voice also looks for the predictive quality of its metrics by triangulating answers to surveys against other data sets providing measures of outcomes. For example, education studies have found that student feedback accurately predict patterns of learning gains associated with that teacher, including in other classrooms and in subsequent years.

Benchmarking is another important analytic tool used by Constituent Voice to better understand the results for any particular survey by comparing answers with the answers received to the same questions by another organisation.

- Dialogue

Survey findings are inherently limited. Using survey findings to inform dialogues with respondents and others significantly extends their explanatory power. These dialogues allow validation of findings, deepen their interpretation, and agree possible solutions. Constituent Voice method emphasizes mutuality across constituents of a problem and the co-creation of solutions.

- Course Correct

Constituent Voice advocates a short cycle iterative “trial and error” approach to introducing change in organisational practices. It is important that organisations inform constituents of any corrective actions so that respondents to future surveys can provide informed views.

== Criticism of Constituent Voice ==
A critical literature on Constituent Voice is yet to emerge. Since it consciously emphasizes utility, it is likely to attract the criticism that it is more concerned about performance management than accurate measurement. As such, it should not replace traditional metrics but complement them. Keystone Accountability co-founder David Bonbright has often been quoted as saying that “Constituent Voice is the most neglected important piece of the measurement puzzle. Not the only important piece, but the most neglected one.”

== See also ==
- Evaluation
- Impact evaluation
- Logic model
- Logical framework approach
- Program evaluation
- Social return on investment
- Continual improvement process
