= Impact assessment =

Evaluations of public policy proposals before passage

Policy impact assessments, or simply impact assessments (IAs), are formal, evidence-based procedures that assess prospective economic, social, and environmental effects of a public policy proposal. They have been incorporated into policy making in the OECD countries and the European Commission. If the assessment is favourable, and the proposed policy is enacted—after a suitable length of time for the policy to gain traction—it might be followed by an impact evaluation; ideally, assessed impacts before the fact and evaluated impacts after the fact are not wildly divergent. In some cases, impact becomes politicized due to a change in the governing regime between assessment and evaluation, and non-congruence might be amplified for ideological reasons. In other cases, the world is a complex place, and assessment is not a perfect art.

Key types of impact assessments include global assessments (global level), policy impact assessment (policy level), strategic environmental assessment (programme and plan level), and environmental impact assessment (project level). Impact assessments can focus on specific themes, such as social impact assessments and gender impact assessments.

IAs can improve legislation by:

- Informing policy makers about potential economic, social, and environmental ramifications
- Improving transparency so that contributions to sustainability and "better regulation" are disclosed and special interest lobbying is discouraged
- Increasing public participation in order to reflect a range of considerations, thereby improving the legitimacy of policies
- Clarifying how public policy helps achieve its goals and priorities through policy indicators
- Contributing to continuous learning in policy development by identifying causalities that inform ex-post review of policies

== Procedure ==
The department which is responsible for the policy proposal usually has to carry out the IA. Although the purpose and orientation of IA procedures differ, IA guidelines in the various jurisdictions all follow a similar set of steps to be followed by desk officers:

1. Planning of the IA
2. Carrying out the impact analysis
3. Consultation of affected stakeholders and the general public
4. Coordination with affected departments
5. Summary and presentation of findings in a report
6. Forwarding findings to decision makers
7. Publication of the IA report (not in all countries)

The analytical steps, which mainly relate to step 2, can be set out as:

1. Problem definition
2. Definition of policy objectives
3. Development of policy options
4. Analysis of impacts
5. Comparison of policy options and recommendation of one option
6. Defining monitoring measures

== Methods ==
Throughout the IA process, methods can be used for support. In recent years governments have increasingly invested in developing and applying methods and tools for IA. Depending on usage, IA methods can be classified as methods for

- Scoping (e.g., checklists)
- For qualitative analysis (e.g., focus groups)
- For quantitative analysis (e.g., life-cycle assessment, material flow accounting, modelling)
- Aggregation and comparison of options (e.g., cost–benefit analysis)
- Analysing coherence (e.g., Gender IA)
- Supporting participation and involvement (e.g., internet consultation)
- Data presentation and involvement (e.g., GIS)
- Monitoring and evaluation (e.g., indicators)

== See also ==
- Impact evaluation
- Outcomes theory
- Participatory impact pathways analysis
- Policy analysis
- Policy studies
- Program evaluation
- True cost accounting
