= Participatory evaluation =

Participatory evaluation is an approach to program evaluation. It provides for the active involvement of stakeholder in the program: providers, partners, beneficiaries, and any other interested parties. All involved decide how to frame the questions used to evaluate the program, and all decide how to measure outcomes and impact. It is often used in international development.

== Participatory evaluation in international development ==
Participatory evaluation in development, is part of the new wave of grassroots development in which local stakeholders have a more valuable role in the development process. Participatory evaluation methods, in comparison to more mainstream evaluation practices, make space for input from locals who have a specialized and more personal set of knowledge on the community's needs. In this context, the term "locals" can include local governments, local non-governmental organizations, local civil society organizations, and local citizens, among various other actors. In the past, evaluation methods in development have been more quantitative in nature, placing more importance on donor-needs and measurable indicators, but participatory evaluation creates more room for multiple stakeholders to provide much needed input. This strategy can increase the overall accuracy and complexity of monitoring and evaluation in development projects, generating more sustainable outcomes. The key idea is that stakeholders, meaning all groups with both an interest and that are affected by the project, are given an opportunity to provide feedback. The hope is then that the feedback will be implemented in good faith.

Participatory evaluation is an extension of participatory development theory. Participatory evaluation methods have been used at all scales of development projects, including in small-scale businesses as well as large-scale projects. Within these contexts, stakeholders are involved at all levels of the development process, including planning, implementation, and monitoring and evaluation.

Other benefits to applying participatory evaluation to international development include an increase in local ownership, higher empowerment rates for all involved parties, more diverse analysis methods, increase in accuracy to local realities, improvements in impacts of development efforts. Participatory evaluation has also been applied beyond international development aid, and having been involved in humanitarian intervention and aid efforts thus increasing the transparency, accountability, and opportunities to learn.

Depending on contexts, participatory evaluation methodologies can vary. Projects can involve active stakeholder participation at every step of the evaluation process; they can control the evaluation process while keeping stakeholders informed and discussing when needed; or projects can train and prep stakeholders to take on development initiatives by learning throughout the evaluation process.

Within the international development context, participatory evaluation is not without challenges. Since stakeholders are such a crucial element to participatory evaluation, a major challenge to this method is ensuring that the right groups have been included in evaluation methods. Further still, the challenge is identifying what practices and data collection methods work best when collaborating with stakeholders, especially when working with multiple stakeholder groups that have clashing values and objectives. Another challenge to implementing participatory evaluation methods is maintaining the balance in power dynamics between different stakeholders of the development project, including the evaluation team itself. As part of project teams, evaluation teams hold an authoritative position and these evaluators have the potential to hold more power than local stakeholders. Ultimately, this power balance can be reflected by skewed results.

== Advantages ==
- Identify locally relevant questions.
- Improve program performance
- Empower participants
- Build capacity
- Develop leaders and build teams
- Sustain organizational learning and growth

== Disadvantages ==
- Time and commitment of all involved
- Resource-intensive during evaluation
- Conflict resolution may be needed

== Characteristics ==
- Participant focus and ownership
- Negotiation
- Learning
- Flexibility

== Applications ==
It is a form of community-based participatory research and participatory action research. The evaluation is designed for the people involved in a program as well as its funders, with the hope that results of the evaluation get used rather than sitting on a program funder's shelf.

Tools for monitoring and evaluation in program development, including international development, such as creating a logic model or outcome mapping, can be forms of participatory evaluation if stakeholders are involved.

This method is endorsed by the United Nations and is used in the development programs of many countries including Canada, the US and New Zealand.

Practitioners of participatory evaluation in academia include Clemencia Rodriguez and Barry Checkoway.

== See also ==
- Public participation
