= Impact analysis =

Impact analysis may refer to:

- Change impact analysis
- Economic impact analysis
- Regulatory Impact Analysis

== See also ==
- Impact assessment
- Impact evaluation
