= Outcomes theory =

Outcomes theory provides the conceptual basis for thinking about, and working with outcomes systems of any type. An outcomes system is any system that: identifies; prioritizes; measures; attributes; or hold parties to account for outcomes of any type in any area.

Outcomes systems go under various names such as: strategic plans; management by results; results-based management systems; outcomes-focused management systems; accountability systems; evidence-based practice systems; and best-practice systems. In addition, outcomes issues are dealt with in traditional areas such as: strategic planning; business planning and risk management.

Outcomes theory theorizes a sub-set of topics covered in diverse ways in other disciplines such as: performance management, organizational development, program evaluation, policy analysis, economics and the other social sciences. The different treatment of outcomes issues in different technical languages in these different disciplines means that it is hard for those building outcomes systems to gain quick access to a generic body of principles about how to set up outcomes systems and fix issues with existing outcomes systems.

== History ==
Outcomes theory was developed by Paul Duignan.

== Overview ==
Outcomes theory is made up of several key conceptual frameworks and a set of principles. The most important framework is Duignan's Outcomes System Diagram. This diagram identifies seven different building-blocks of outcomes systems. These building-blocks are analogous to the building-blocks that make up accounting systems (e.g. general ledger, assets register). In the case of an outcomes system they are a different set of building-blocks which are necessary for outcomes systems to function properly. The building blocks are:

1. A model of the high-level outcomes being sought within the outcomes system, the steps which it is believed are necessary to get to these outcomes, previous evidence linking such steps to such outcomes, current priorities and whether current activity is focused on these priorities. Within outcomes theory these models are, for convenience, conceived of as visual models. They are used, for example, in visual strategic planning.
2. 'Controllable' indicators – measures of at least some of the boxes within the model. Controllable indicators have the feature that their mere measurement is proof that they have been caused by the project, organization or intervention that they are controlled by. This means that they are ideal for use as accountability measures (e.g. Key Performance Indicators KPIs).
3. 'Not-necessarily controllable indicators – indicators that are influenced by factors in addition to the intervention. These have the feature that their mere measurement does not say anything about what has caused them.
4. Non-impact evaluation – while 2 and 3 above are usually routinely collected information, outcomes systems can also utilize more one-off studies (referred to as types of 'evaluation'). Non-impact evaluation focuses on improving the 'lower-level' steps within the outcomes model (it is often included within aspects of: developmental, formative, process and implementation evaluation)
5. Impact evaluation – evaluation that makes a claim about what has caused high-level outcomes to have occurred (i.e. whether or not the intervention has improved them).
6. Comparative and economic evaluation – evaluation that compares different interventions or translates their benefits into dollar terms so that different interventions focusing on different issues can be compared.
7. Contracting, accountability and performance management arrangements – the arrangements that are in place (e.g. in the form of a contract between a funder and provider) as to what information will be collected regarding 1-6 and what parties will be held to account for, and rewarded and punished for.

== Example of a principle ==
An example of a principle within outcomes theory is the Impact evaluation only option for high-level outcome attribution if no controllable indicators at top of outcomes model principle. This is the principle that in an instance where building-block two (controllable indicators) does not connect to building block one of the outcomes model, then building-block five (impact evaluation) offers the only way to obtain more information about whether changes in high-level indicators can be attributed to an intervention.

== Uses ==
Williams and Hummelbrunner (2009) summarize some of the uses of outcomes theory: "Outcomes theory intends to improve outcomes system architecture, that is, related systems that deal in one way or another with outcomes, by providing a clear common technical language, thus helping to avoid unnecessary duplication and identify gaps to be filled. Outcomes theory also specifies the structural features and the key principles of well-constructed outcomes systems. ... This helps people without significant background in outcomes thinking to construct sound and sustainable outcomes systems."

== Practical application ==
Duignan's Outcomes-Focused Visual Strategic Planning is an applied implementation of outcomes theory. It is based on building a visual strategic plan and then using it for: prioritization; performance management; and assessing organizational impact.

== See also ==
- Evaluation
- Impact evaluation
- Logic model
- Logical framework approach
- Program evaluation
- Strategic planning
