= Participatory impact pathways analysis =

Projecting method

Overview of the PIPA process.

Participatory impact pathways analysis (PIPA) is a project management approach in which the participants in a project (project and program are used synonymously from now on), including project staff, key stakeholders, and the ultimate beneficiaries, together co-construct their program theory.

== Overview ==
The PIPA theory describes plausible impact pathways by which project outputs are used by others to achieve a chain of outcomes leading to a contribution to eventual impact on social, environmental or economic conditions. Impact pathways are a type of logic model, that is, they constitute a model that describes the logic of what the project will do, is doing, or what it did.

PIPA helps workshop participants identify, discuss, and write down assumptions and theories about how the project activities and outputs could contribute to project goals. The description of these assumptions and theories is a description of the project’s impact pathways. PIPA has helped workshop participants to:

- Clarify and communicate the project’s logic of intervention and its potential for achieving impact
- Understand other projects and identify areas for collaboration
- Generate a feeling of common purpose and better programmatic integration
- Produce an impact narrative describing the project's intervention logic
- Produce a framework for subsequent monitoring and evaluation

== History ==
PIPA was first used in a workshop in January 2006 in Ghana, with seven projects funded by the "Challenge Program on Water and Food". Nine PIPA workshops have been held since then for 46 projects. Researchers from the International Center for Tropical Agriculture, WorldFish Center, and International Potato Center are developing PIPA.

PIPA developed from innovation histories and work carried out by the Institutional Learning and Change Initiative. A paper describing PIPA was accepted for publication in the Canadian Journal of Program Evaluation.

== PIPA topics ==
=== PIPA projects ===
PIPA is useful when two or more projects in the same program wish to better integrate. At least two people for each project should attend, preferably the project leader and someone else who knows the project and has time and inclination to follow up on what comes out of the workshop. PIPA also works well when one project wishes to build up common understanding and commitment from its stakeholders. In this case, two or more representatives from each important stakeholder group should attend.

=== PIPA process ===
PIPA can be used at the beginning of a project, in the middle or at the end as way of documenting and learning from the project. PIPA describes project (or program) impact pathways in two ways: (i) causal chains of activities, outputs and outcomes through which a project is expected to achieve its purpose and goal; and (ii) networks of evolving relationships between project implementing organizations, stakeholders and ultimate beneficiaries that are necessary to achieve the goal. The workshop process, shown in the diagram, develops the two perspectives in turn and then integrates them.

=== PIPA Workshop ===
Drawing a project's network in a PIPA workshop

The workshop begins with participants developing a problem tree that links the project goal framed in terms of a challenge or problem to what the project is actually going to do. The approach used for developing the problem tree is based on work by Renger and Titcombe (2003). The problem tree helps participants clarify the key problems / opportunities their projects are addressing, and the outputs (things others will use) that their projects need to produce. Participants then carry out a visioning exercise, which borrows from appreciative inquiry, to describe project success two years after the project's conclusion based on the adoption and use of project outputs. These three steps (see diagram) usually take about a day to complete and provide the information needed to describe a causal chain of outcomes needed to achieve success.

The second part of the workshop involves drawing the networks of people and organizations who are already working in the area and then drawing the networks that will be needed to achieve the project vision. Analyzing the differences between the two can help identify an effective communication strategy. The final step is to integrate the causal chain and the network perspectives by drawing a timeline.

Optionally, monitoring and evaluation can be discussed by identifying SMART criteria (specific, measurable, attributable, realistic, and time-bound) to measure expected change, and by identifying "most significant change" to pick up unexpected ones. A key component of any evaluation plan is that project staff periodically revisit their vision, problem trees, and network maps to update them, identify necessary changes to the timeline, and document the changes.

=== After the workshop ===
The information from PIPA workshops has been used in a number of ways:

- At a minimum a clean record is kept of the workshop outputs to provide impact hypotheses for any future impact evaluation and to help communicate the project's rationale.
- The evaluators who run the workshops have worked with project staff to write impact narratives similar to John Mayne’s (2004) performance stories, that explains the logic of the project intervention in a narrative form as writing a coherent narrative can surface otherwise hidden assumptions.
- The information from the network maps has been processed using social network analysis software Ucinet and NetDraw to produce composite maps that show which CPWF projects are working with which organizations. These maps help the basin coordinators do their job.

== See also ==
- Program evaluation
- Logic model
- Evaluation
