= Academic program prioritization =

Academic program prioritization is the activity or process in which an academic institution assesses and prioritizes its programs for the purpose of more strategically allocating its funding and resources. This is a process a school engages in when it intends to make systematic changes. For instance, Boise State University underwent a yearlong process of exploring and assessing its programs with the intention of making the university more focused and more aligned with the needs of its students.

Program prioritization is similar to program evaluation but differs in that it not only involves evaluating programs but also involves making financial decisions concerning program funding. Program prioritization can be a significant issue, having the potential to affect the lives and goals of both students and faculty. This page deals with program prioritization in the context of higher education, and it attempts to provide a basic description of what this entails.

== General description ==
A school engaged in the process of prioritizing its programs may decide to either increase, decrease, continue, or discontinue the funding for particular programs, leading to these programs being either expanded, downsized, unchanged, or discontinued entirely. For example, in 2013, Western Carolina University announced that after a process of program prioritization it would discontinue several programs including a bachelor's in German, a minor in women's studies, as well master's programs in music, health sciences, English, and mathematics.

Programs are generally prioritized on the basis of their student populations and potential to attract new students. Though, other factors may also weigh in on the likelihood of a program being downsized or discontinued, such as its overall cost for the university.

== Causes ==
Prioritization of programs and reallocation of funding are usually necessitated by the combination of two factors: 1) A school's desire to develop and expand, and 2) limited funding. If a school wants to grow and expand its programs, but doesn't possess the resources to develop each program equally, prioritization may become necessary. Schools are under pressure to expand, and therefore they are going to be under pressure to reallocate funding towards more successful programs.
