= Carolina Population Center =

American university program

- Established: 1966
- Director: Karen Benjamin Guzzo
- Academic staff: ~300
- Location: University of North Carolina; Chapel Hill, North Carolina, U.S.
- Website: cpc.unc.edu

The Carolina Population Center (CPC) is an interdisciplinary research center at the University of North Carolina at Chapel Hill. CPC was established in 1966. The primary goals of the center are to conduct research on population, health, aging, and the environment, and share data and findings that push the field forward and train the next generation of population scholars.

== Overview ==
The Carolina Population Center has 67 faculty affiliates representing 16 departments from the UNC College of Arts & Sciences, the UNC Gillings School of Global Public Health, and the UNC School of Medicine at the University of North Carolina at Chapel Hill. Work at the center is divided into six major themes:

- Aging in Diverse Contexts
- Inequality, Mobility, and Well-Being
- Links Between Health and Social and Economic Productivity
- Measurements and Methods
- Population, Health, and Environment
- Sexuality, Reproduction, Fertility, and Families

CPC is the home of the National Longitudinal Study of Adolescent to Adult Health, also known as Add Health. It also houses the China Health and Nutrition Survey, the Cebu Longitudinal Health and Nutrition Survey, the Russia Longitudinal Monitoring Survey (RMLS), the Global Food Research Program, data from family planning and reproductive health program evaluations (MEASURE Evaluation; Measurement, Learning & Evaluation), and data about the effect of social cash transfer programs on poverty or disease transition in several African countries.

== History ==
In 1964, UNC Chancellor Paul Sharp invited Moye Freymann, MD, DrPH, the director of the Ford Foundation's population program in India, to Chapel Hill to discuss establishing a population program at the university. That same year, Sharp appointed 11 faculty members from across the campus to an interdisciplinary committee with the goal of creating a population center. Chaired by Dr. John B. Graham, a professor of genetics at the UNC Medical School, the committee comprised faculty from the medical school, sociology, biostatistics, maternal and child health, economics, anthropology, and journalism. The Carolina Population Center was established in 1966 with funding from the Ford Foundation. Moye Wicks Freymann was a founder of the Population Center. Freymann's work with the Ford Foundation's family planning programs put him in a prime position to help UNC launch its program. Making several visits to UNC in 1964 and 1965, Freymann helped the interdisciplinary committee secure funds from the U.S. Agency for International Development (USAID). He also helped the committee prepare the "ultimate" Ford Foundation proposal, and, when the foundation awarded the university $1.5 million in 1965, these funds provided the bulk of support for the new population center. When the committee appointed him director of the new center in 1966, Freymann also became a professor of health administration at UNC and promptly set about building the Carolina Population Center into a strong university center focused on addressing the population crisis.
