= RCEP (disambiguation) =

RCEP usually refers to the Regional Comprehensive Economic Partnership, a free trade agreement in the Asia-Pacific.

RCEP may also refer to:

- Royal Commission on Environmental Pollution (1970-2011) of the United Kingdom
- Royal Canadian Equity Party, of the 2006 Peterborough municipal election
- Revue Canadienne d'Évaluation de Programme, the French language name for the bilingual English-French journal Canadian Journal of Program Evaluation
- Registered Clinical Exercise Physiologist, of exercise physiology
- Registered Continuing Education Provider, for continuing education
