= Center for Interdisciplinary Law and Policy Studies =

Coordinates: 39°59′46″N 83°00′29″W

The Center for Interdisciplinary Law and Policy Studies (CILPS) at the Ohio State University's Moritz College of Law is committed to the promotion of interdisciplinary research, teaching, and public outreach designed to shed light on the nature and operation of law and legal institutions, as well as the impacts of law on society and culture.

Director: Katherine Hunt Federle, the Joseph S. Platt/Porter, Wright, Morris & Arthur Professor of Law at The Ohio State University's Moritz College of Law.
