= Keystone Accountability =

- Company type: Nonprofit
- Industry: Consulting for nonprofits
- Founded: 2004
- Headquarters: United Kingdom, United States
- Services: Measuring impact of social purpose organizations
- Revenue: 1,463,208 pound sterling (2017)
- Number of employees: 13 (2017)
- Website: keystoneaccountability.org

Keystone Accountability is a USA 501(c)(3) not-for-profit organization with locations in United Kingdom and the United States. It was founded in 2004 by David Bonbright and Andre Proctor.

Keystone's mission is to improve the effectiveness of social purpose organizations. Using benchmarking surveys, feedback loops and analysis, Keystone consults on NGOs, international development agencies, global companies, and major foundations to plan, measure and report social change.

In 2009, Keystone blended participatory evaluation and customer satisfaction to create a new methodology referred to as Constituent Voice.

== Past Projects ==
- Keystone Partner Survey (2012 - present)
- Global Knowledge Partnership Evaluation (2007)
- The Rural Enterprise Development Initiative. (2007)
- East African Grantee Survey (2008)
- Grantmaker Performance Survey (2008)
- Networks Survey (2009)
- International NGO Survey (2010–2011)
- Social Investment Performance (2010)
- Southern Africa Grantee Survey (2010–2011)

== See also ==
- Philanthropy
- Social enterprise
- Social change
- Consultant
- NGO
- Socially responsible investing
