= United Nations Evaluation Group =

The United Nations Evaluation Group (UNEG) is a platform for the different United Nations (UN) evaluation offices to discuss evaluation issues and to share evaluation knowledge. It suggests norms and standards for all evaluation offices in the UN and delivers thematic reports concerning monitoring and evaluation. It has 45 members and 3 observers listed below.

== History ==
UNEG was created in January 1984 with the name ‘Inter-Agency Working Group on Evaluation’ (IAWG). It was part of the UN consultative group on programme questions (CCPOQ). It is a group of heads of UN evaluation offices which meet to discuss system wide evaluation issues. Its genesis owes much to the work of the Joint Inspection Unit (JIU) in particular Inspector Earl Sohm, JIU/REP/85/10 and JIU/REP/85/11.

Much of its initial work was on designing, testing and introducing an M&E system for UN operational activities in particular technical assistance projects. This was done by 1986. Most of UN operational activities were then funded by the UN Development Programme (UNDP) which provided the secretariat and the leadership for the Group.

Policy and Strategy evaluation were paid insufficient attention initially. {An evaluation of the IAWG in the year 2000 pointed out that it needed to return to its proactive function with specific deliverables that could be used by the UN evaluation system in their work. The recommendations of the report highlighted the need for structured interaction among UNEG members, annual work planning, work groups to move the agenda forward and developing a website to enhance knowledge sharing. In 2003, the IAWG changed its name to the United Nations Evaluation Group (UNEG).

== Mission ==
The mission on UNEG is to promote and support the independence, credibility and usefulness of the evaluation units in the UN system. According to its Strategy 2014-2019, UNEG's work is focused on four strategic objectives:

1) Evaluation functions and products of UN entities meet the UNEG Norms and Standards for evaluation;

2) UN entities and partners use evaluation in support of accountability and programme learning;

3) Evaluation informs UN system-wide initiatives and emerging demands; and

4) UNEG benefits from and contributes to an enhanced global evaluation profession.

== Membership ==
UNEG currently has 46 members and 3 observers. Membership reserved for the units responsible for evaluation in the UN system, including the specialized agencies, funds, programmes and affiliated organizations. These units should have, or aspire to have, the required professional knowledge, experience and responsibility for evaluation as defined by the updated UNEG Norms and Standards for Evaluation (2016).

Members:

- Comprehensive Nuclear-Test-Ban Treaty Organization Preparatory Commission (CTBTO)
- Food and Agriculture Organization of the United Nations (FAO)
- Global Environment Facility (GEF)
- International Atomic Energy Agency (IAEA)
- International Civil Aviation Organization (ICAO)
- International Fund for Agricultural Development (IFAD)
- International Labour Organization (ILO)
- International Maritime Organization (IMO)
- International Organisation for Cooperation in Evaluation (IOCE) (Institutional Partners)
- International Organization for Migration (IOM)
- International Trade Centre (ITC)
- Office for the Coordination of Humanitarian Affairs (OCHA)
- Office of the United Nations High Commissioner for Human Rights (OHCHR)
- Office of the United Nations High Commissioner for Refugees (UNHCR)
- Organisation for the Prohibition of Chemical Weapons (OPCW)
- United Nations Department of Public Information (DPI)
- United Nations Department for Safety and Security (UNDSS) (temporary membership)
- United Nations Capital Development Fund (UNCDF)
- United Nations Children's Fund (UNICEF)
- United Nations Conference on Trade and Development (UNCTAD)
- United Nations Department for General Assembly and Conference Management (DGACM)
- Department of Peacekeeping Operations (DPKO)
- United Nations Department of Economic and Social Affairs (UNDESA)
- United Nations Development Programme (UNDP)
- United Nations Economic and Social Commission for Asia and the Pacific (UNESCAP)
- United Nations Economic and Social Commission for Western Asia (UNESCWA)
- United Nations Economic Commission for Africa (UNECA)
- United Nations Economic Commission for Europe (UNECE)
- United Nations Economic Commission for Latin America and the Caribbean (UNECLAC)
- United Nations Educational, Scientific and Cultural Organization (UNESCO)
- United Nations Entity for Gender Equality and the Empowerment of Women (UNWOMEN)
- United Nations Environment Programme (UNEP)
- United Nations Human Settlements Programme (UN-HABITAT)
- United Nations Industrial Development Organization (UNIDO)
- United Nations Office of Internal Oversight Services (OIOS)
- United Nations Office on Drugs and Crime (UNODC)
- United Nations Peace Building Support Office - Financing for Peacebuilding (PBSO)
- United Nations Population Fund (UNFPA)
- Joint United Nations Programme on HIV/AIDS (UNAIDS)
- United Nations Relief and Works Agency for Palestine Refugees in the Near East (UNRWA)
- United Nations Volunteers (UNV)
- World Food Programme (WFP)
- World Health Organization (WHO)
- World Intellectual Property Organization (WIPO)
- World Meteorological Organization (WMO)
- World Trade Organization (WTO)

Observers:

- Joint Inspection Unit (JIU)
- SDG Achievement Fund (SDG-F)
- World Bank (WB)

== See also ==
- Monitoring and Evaluation
- Evaluation
- United Nations
