= MEASURE Evaluation =

MEASURE (Monitoring and Evaluation to Assess and Use Results) Evaluation aims to strengthen the capacity of developing countries to gather, interpret, and use data to improve health. MEASURE Evaluation creates tools and approaches for rigorous evaluations, providing evidence to address health challenges, and strengthening health information systems so countries can make better decisions and sustain good health outcomes over time. MEASURE Evaluation is a cooperative agreement awarded by the U.S. Agency for International Development (USAID) to the Carolina Population Center at the University of North Carolina at Chapel Hill and five partner organizations: ICF International, John Snow Inc., Management Sciences for Health, Palladium, and Tulane University. This MEASURE Evaluation partnership provides technical leadership through collaboration at local, national, and global levels to build the sustainable capacity of developing nations to identify data needs, collect and analyze technically sound data, and use that data for health decision-making.

== Purpose ==
MEASURE Evaluation works closely with USAID, its country missions, and counterparts to improve the collection, analysis, and presentation of data to promote better use of data in planning, policy-making, managing, monitoring, and evaluating population, health, and nutrition programs. The underlying premise is that improving the use of information in health sector decision-making will lead to better health services, systems, and outcomes.

The last few years have seen a dramatic increase in demand for high-quality health information through large global health initiatives that emphasize quantitative measures of progress to ensure accountability. These demands stretch weak and overburdened monitoring and evaluation (M&E) and health information systems (HIS). There is an urgent need to strengthen the performance of HIS and M&E systems at all levels, improve measurement in areas in which measurement methods are weak, increase evidence on the effectiveness of global health programs, and strengthen the use of information beyond meeting reporting requirements to inform program decision-making.

== Monitoring and Evaluation ==
M&E is the process by which data are collected and analyzed to provide information to policy-makers and others for use in program planning and project management. Monitoring focuses on the implementation process and progress towards the achievement of program objectives. Evaluation measures how well the program activities have met expected objectives and/or the extent to which changes in outcomes can be attributed to the program.

M&E is important because it helps program implementers make informed decisions regarding program operations and service delivery based on objective evidence. It also ensures the most effective and efficient use of resources, helps determine the success or failure of a program, and assists in meeting organizational requirements such as reporting. Most importantly, monitoring and evaluation often convince donors that their investments have been worthwhile.

MEASURE Evaluation supports the international development goal of maximizing program results, by systematically collecting and analyzing information about and evidence on health program performance and impact. Evaluation findings support organizational learning, strengthen health systems, and improve program effectiveness so that people live healthier lives.

== Health Information System Strengthening ==
Strong health information systems are a crucial element in overall health systems and, therefore, a critical factor in achieving better health for people. Health information systems provide essential information to enable all decision makers—from policy-makers to health providers—to make evidence-informed choices for budgeting on health, health workforce needs, and services for citizens.

MEASURE Evaluation has worked in this arena for over 20 years, assisting countries in the systematic collection and analysis of evidence about health program performance and impact. MEASURE Evaluation's Health Information Systems Strengthening Resource Center serves as a central hub for the exploration of what works to strengthen HIS, a repository for evidence about how strengthened health information systems improve health outcomes, and a learning space for health professionals to share and exchange information on strengthening health information systems.

The project also develops tools and builds capacity in developing countries to strengthen electronic medical records, routine health information systems, and community-based health information systems. This involves developing data quality procedures; establishing guidelines for health data confidentiality, security, and ethics; improving data system interoperability; helping countries integrate data from disease surveillance and response systems, commodities and logistics management information systems, and civil registration and population health surveys; and promoting data demand and use. Other focal areas include gender, health, and knowledge management.

== MEASURE Evaluation's Work ==
Under optimum conditions, public health relies upon a network of facilities staffed with competent providers, a ready supply of essential medicines, and a governance structure supported by managers who understand the health issues of the population and are equipped to make good policy and program decisions based on evidence.

MEASURE Evaluation works in low- and middle-income countries (LMICs) to strengthen health information systems. Specific populations addressed by the project include orphans and vulnerable children, adolescents, and key populations at risk of HIV.

The project applies research expertise and provides technical assistance to developing countries in data ethics, data science, network analysis, data quality, geospatial analysis, health informatics, secondary data analysis, digital data collection, statistical sampling, and systems thinking. It conducts studies using a range of research methods: rigorous evaluation (outcome, impact, economic, and process evaluations), complexity-aware methods, mixed-methods studies, surveys, modeling, and most significant change.

MEASURE Evaluation researches health system performance; builds human capacity; and supports public health practitioners and policymakers to use data to perform these six essential functions of a health information system:

1. Monitor trends in health outcomes and services.

2. Ensure that data are trustworthy.

3. Make decisions quickly and efficiently.

4. Identify what works.

5. Ensure the coordination and equity of health services.

6. Manage resources for the greatest benefit.

== Where MEASURE Evaluation Works ==
MEASURE Evaluation works in sub-Saharan Africa, Latin America, the Caribbean, Southeast Asia, and Eurasia, implementing research and building capacity for rigorous evaluation and health information system strengthening in about 40 countries at any one time.

== Earlier Phases ==
MEASURE Evaluation is now in Phase IV. Phase I (1998–2003) focused on data analysis and the design of new tools. Phase II (2004–2009) included data demand and utilization (now Data Demand and Use), training and capacity building, collaboration and coordination, and research and development. Phase III added knowledge management and organization development. Phase IV strengthened the project's dual focus on evaluation and health information system strengthening.

== Monitor ==
Monitor is a monthly update sent via email detailing all new developments at MEASURE Evaluation. Currently, this newsletter reaches about 13,000 people worldwide.
