= Canadian Journal of Program Evaluation =

- Discipline: Program Evaluation
- Language: English and French
- English: Canadian Journal of Program Evaluation
- French: Revue Canadienne d'Évaluation de Programme
- Edited by: Astrid Brousselle

Publication details
- History: 1985-present
- Publisher: University of Victoria Library on behalf of the Canadian Evaluation Society (Canada)
- Frequency: Biannual
- Open access: Yes
- License: CC BY-NC 4.0

Standard abbreviations
- ISO 4: Can. J. Program Eval.

Indexing
- ISSN: 0834-1516

Links
- Journal homepage

The Canadian Journal of Program Evaluation (CJPE; French: Revue Canadienne d'Évaluation de Programme; RCEP) is an English and French -language biannual peer-reviewed academic journal focusing on the theory and practice of program evaluation. It is published by the Canadian Evaluation Society and is hosted at the University of Victoria library.

== Abstracting and indexing ==
The journal is abstracted and indexed in:

- Allen Press Cooperative Subscription Catalogue
- AAUP Journal Subscription Catalogue
- Canadian Media List
- Corpus Almanac and Canadian Sourcebook (Print)
- Dustbooks
- Education Research Complete
- Education Source
- Emerging Sources Citation Index (ESCI)
- Oxbridge Communications Media
- Public Administration Abstracts
- Social Works Abstracts Plus
- Sociological Abstracts
- Ulrich's International Periodicals Directory
