= Joint Inspection Unit =

United Nations agency

The Joint Inspection Unit (JIU) was established by the United Nations to be an impartial unit to conduct independent oversight, evaluations, inspections, and investigations of the UN and its agencies. As such, it focuses on accountability, management, administration, efficiency, effectiveness, and promoting greater coordination between UN agencies.

== Establishment ==
The JIU was first established at the 21st session of the General Assembly of the United Nations in 1966 as a result of a UN budgetary crisis. An ad hoc committee of experts was assembled to evaluate the finances of the United Nations and its agencies. In 1978 the JIU was implemented as a permanent statute.

== Evaluations, inspections, and investigations ==
=== Evaluation ===
An evaluation assesses and provides feedback to organizations on design and implementation of activities and interventions related to the goals of UN.

=== Inspection ===
An inspection is a review of internal governance, management and/or operations. It is to identify areas for improvement, determine best practices, and ensure compliance with rules and regulations.

=== Investigation ===
An investigation is a response to an allegation of rules or regulations violations.

== Strategic framework ==
=== System-wide reviews: coverage and approach ===
The JIU will use a variety of methods provide information to help agencies and organizations improve performance. Reviews concerning the 2030 Agenda for Sustainable Development, accountability and oversight, management and administration practices, internationally agreed goals and conventions, and inter-agency coordination will be the unit's priority.

=== Single organization management and administration reviews: coverage and approach ===
In resolution 73/287 the General Assembly requested that the JIU conduct yearly single organization reviews. The JIU acknowledges that factors within participating organizations and the unit itself may be limiting, but the Unit is formulating strategies to assess which organizations to prioritize for review.

=== Strengthening the quality and rigour of the Unit’s products ===
The JIU is committed to an ongoing process of improvement and will continue to use feedback on the relevance and quality of its work and consult both internally and with participating organizations to strengthen internal workings. Additionally, the Unit will focus on data analytics, communications, and oversight and evaluation methodologies to build the capacities of staff in the secretariat.

=== Strengthening the outcome and impact of the Unit’s products ===
The JIU will update the web-based tracking system to gather and analyse data about the impact and implementation of its recommendations. The JIU plans to use this data to conduct analysis of its work in particular thematic areas to gain insight to the effectiveness and efficiency of the UN system within a given subject area.

=== Joint Inspection Unit benchmarking framework ===
The JIU has developed benchmarking framework to provide system-wide standards which allows for comparability, coherence and the sharing of good practices among organizations. These frameworks have been some of the JIU's contributions. As such, the JIU will ensure that these frameworks remain accessible and develop best practices for engaging and sharing them with stakeholders.

=== Support to the evaluation function of the United Nations system ===
The JIU will remain available to help intergovernmental bodies with their internal evaluations and external evaluations of programmes and activities.

=== Investigations ===
The JIU guidelines state that, "[t]he goal of an investigation is to review a specific case involving alleged violations of rules and regulations or other established procedures; mismanagement; misconduct; waste of resources; or abuses of authority." The JIU's general principles and guidelines for investigations define the details of the Units mandate and scope, investigation standards and process, and management of investigation outcomes. The general standards for JIU inspections, evaluations and investigations are independence, competence, integrity, due care, and quality.

== Current Inspectors ==
Name	Country	Term
Al-Musawi, Mr. Mohanad Ali Omran	Iraq	2023-2027
Augusto, Mr. Makiese Kinkela	Angola	2026-2030
Chernikov, Mr. Pavel	Russian Federation	2023-2027
Cronin, Ms. Eileen	United States of America	2017-2026
Fernández Opazo, Ms. Carolina	Mexico	2022–2026
Goitsemang, Mr. Gaeimelwe	Botswana	2023-2027
Hoshino Mr. Toshiya	Japan	2023-2027
Hunte, Mr. Conrod Cecil	Antigua and Barbuda	2023-2027
Jullier, Mr. Marcel	Switzerland	2026-2030
Miranda Hita, Mr. Jesús	Spain	2021-2030
Moraru, Mr. Victor	Republic of Moldova	2021-2030
