= Policy studies =

Subdiscipline of political science

Policy studies is a subdiscipline of political science that includes the analysis of the process of policymaking (the policy process) and the contents of policy (policy analysis). Policy analysis includes substantive area research (such as health or education policy), program evaluation and impact studies, and policy design. It "involves systematically studying the nature, causes, and effects of alternative public policies, with particular emphasis on determining the policies that will achieve given goals." It emerged in the United States in the 1960s and 1970s.

Policy studies also examines the conflicts and conflict resolution that arise from the making of policies in civil society, the private sector, or more commonly, in the public sector (e.g. government).

While policy studies frequently focuses on the public sector, it is applicable to other organizations (e.g., the not-for-profit sector). Some policy study experts graduate from public policy schools with public policy degrees. Alternatively, experts may have backgrounds in policy analysis, program evaluation, sociology, psychology, philosophy, economics, anthropology, geography, law, political science, social work, environmental planning and public administration.

Traditionally, the field of policy studies focused on domestic policy, with the notable exceptions of foreign and defense policies. However, the wave of economic globalization, which ensued in the late twentieth and early twenty-first centuries, created a need for a subset of policy studies that focuses on global governance, especially as it relates to issues that transcend national borders such as climate change, terrorism, nuclear proliferation, and economic development. This subset of policy studies, which is often referred to as international policy studies, typically requires mastery of a second language and attention to cross-cultural issues in order to address national and cultural biases.

== See also ==
- Association for Public Policy Analysis and Management
- Public policy
- Public policy schools
- Public administration
- Public policy of the United States
- Public policy research
