= Monitoring and evaluation =

Business process

Monitoring and evaluation (often combined and referred to as "M&E") are processes used by organizations such as companies, government agencies, international organisations and NGOs, with the goal of improving their management of outputs, outcomes and impact. Monitoring and evaluation can be distinguished:

- monitoring includes the continuous assessment of programmes based on early detailed information on the progress or delay of the ongoing assessed activities.
- evaluation involves the examination of the relevance, effectiveness, efficiency and impact of activities in the light of specified objectives.

Monitoring and evaluation processes can be managed by the donors financing the assessed activities, by an independent branch of the implementing organization, by the project managers or implementing team themselves and/or by a private company. The credibility and objectivity of monitoring and evaluation reports depend very much on the independence of the evaluators. Their expertise and independence is of major importance for the process to be successful. The common ground for monitoring and evaluation is that they are both management tools.

Many international organizations such as the United Nations, USAID, the World Bank group and the Organization of American States have been utilizing this process for many years. The process is also growing in popularity in the developing countries where governments have created their own national systems to assess development projects, the resource management and the government activities or administration. The developed countries are using this process to assess their own development and cooperation agencies.

== Monitoring ==
Monitoring is a continuous assessment that aims at providing all stakeholders with early detailed information on the progress or delay of the ongoing assessed activities. It is an oversight of the activity's implementation stage. Its purpose is to determine if the outputs, deliveries and schedules planned have been reached so that action can be taken to correct the deficiencies as quickly as possible.

Good planning, combined with effective monitoring and evaluation, can play a major role in enhancing the effectiveness of development programs and projects. Good planning helps focus on the results that matter, while monitoring and evaluation help us learn from past successes and challenges and inform decision making so that current and future initiatives are better able to improve people's lives and expand their choices.

== Evaluation ==
An evaluation is a systematic and objective examination concerning the relevance, effectiveness, efficiency, impact and sustainability of activities in the light of specified objectives. The idea in evaluating projects is to isolate errors in order to avoid repeating them and to underline and promote the successful mechanisms for current and future projects.

An important goal of evaluation is to provide recommendations and lessons to the project managers and implementation teams that have worked on the projects and for the ones that will implement and work on similar projects.

Evaluations are also indirectly a means to report to the donor about the activities implemented. It is a means to verify that the donated funds are being well managed and transparently spent. The evaluators are supposed to check and analyze the budget lines and to report the findings in their work. Monitoring and Evaluation is also useful in the Facilities [Hospitals], it enables the donors such as WHO and UNICEF to know whether the funds provided are well utilized in purchasing drugs and also equipment in the Hospitals.

== Differentiation ==
Evaluation is a systematic and objective examination which is conducted on monthly, yearly or end-of-project basis, unlike monitoring, which is a continuous assessment, providing stakeholders with early information. For monitoring, data and information collection for tracking progress according to the terms of reference is gathered periodically which is not the case in evaluations for which the data and information collection is happening during or in view of the evaluation. The monitoring is a short term assessment and does not take into consideration the outcomes and impact unlike the evaluation process which also assesses the outcomes and sometimes longer term impact. This impact assessment occurs sometimes after the end of a project, even though it is rare because of its cost and of the difficulty to determine whether the project is responsible for the observed results.

Monitoring checks on all the activities on the last [implementation stage], unlike evaluation, which entails information on whether the donated funds are well managed and that they are transparently spent.

== Importance ==
Although evaluations are often retrospective, their purpose is essentially forward looking. Evaluation applies the lessons and recommendations to decisions about current and future programmes. Evaluations can also be used to promote new projects, get support from governments, raise funds from public or private institutions and inform the general public on the different activities.

The Paris Declaration on Aid Effectiveness in February 2005 and the follow-up meeting in Accra underlined the importance of the evaluation process and of the ownership of its conduct by the projects' hosting countries. Many developing countries now have M&E systems and the tendency is growing.

UK Government guidance on financial relationships between government departments and third sector organisations states that:

If a government organisation (called a "funder" ...) has a financial agreement with an external organisation ("[a] provider"), the funder must monitor the provider to ensure regularity, propriety and value for money.

Guidance notes that there are some problems arising from "poor practice in monitoring" and uses the term "intelligent monitoring" to reflect the use of appropriate good practices which avoid these problems. (Note: For example, "intelligent monitoring" is proportionate to risk.) The UK Cabinet Office published its "Principles of Proportionate Monitoring and Reporting" in 2009, alongside this National Audit Office guidance. The principles include an expectation that funded organisations are enabled to see "why reporting is important".

== Performance measurement ==
The credibility of findings and assessments depends to a large extent on the manner in which monitoring and evaluation is conducted. To assess performance, it is necessary to select, before the implementation of the project, indicators which will permit to rate the targeted outputs and outcomes. According to the United Nations Development Programme (UNDP), an outcome indicator has two components: the baseline which is the situation before the programme or project begins, and the target which is the expected situation at the end of the project. An output indicator that does not have any baseline as the purpose of the output is to introduce something that does not exist yet.

== In the United Nations ==
The most important agencies of the United Nations have a monitoring and evaluation unit. All these agencies are supposed to follow the common standards of the United Nations Evaluation Group (UNEG). These norms concern the Institutional framework and management of the evaluation function, the competencies and ethics, and the way to conduct evaluations and present reports (design, process, team selection, implementation, reporting and follow up). This group also provides guidelines and relevant documentation to all evaluation organs being part of the United Nations or not.

Most agencies implementing projects and programmes, even if following the common UNEG standards, have their own handbook and guidelines on how to conduct M&E. Indeed, the UN agencies have different specialisations and have different needs and ways of approaching M&E. The Joint Inspection Unit of the United Nations periodically conducts system-wide reviews of the evaluation functions of their 28 Participating Organizations.

== Evaluation in the Age of Artificial Intelligence ==
Generative artificial intelligence is increasingly being adopted across the evaluation lifecycle, including evaluation design, data collection and analysis and reporting. The FRAME framework provides guidance for its responsible use in monitoring and evaluation, structured around five principles: accountability, stakeholder engagement, epistemic integrity, transparency and proportionality. These principles are used during seven evaluation phases and emphasise that humans still bear the responsibility for decisions taken with the help of AI (Gandhi, Bruce & Nielsen, 2027).

== See also ==
- Evaluation
- MEASURE Evaluation
- PDCA
- Hawthorne effect
