= Logic model =

Method of depicting causal relationships

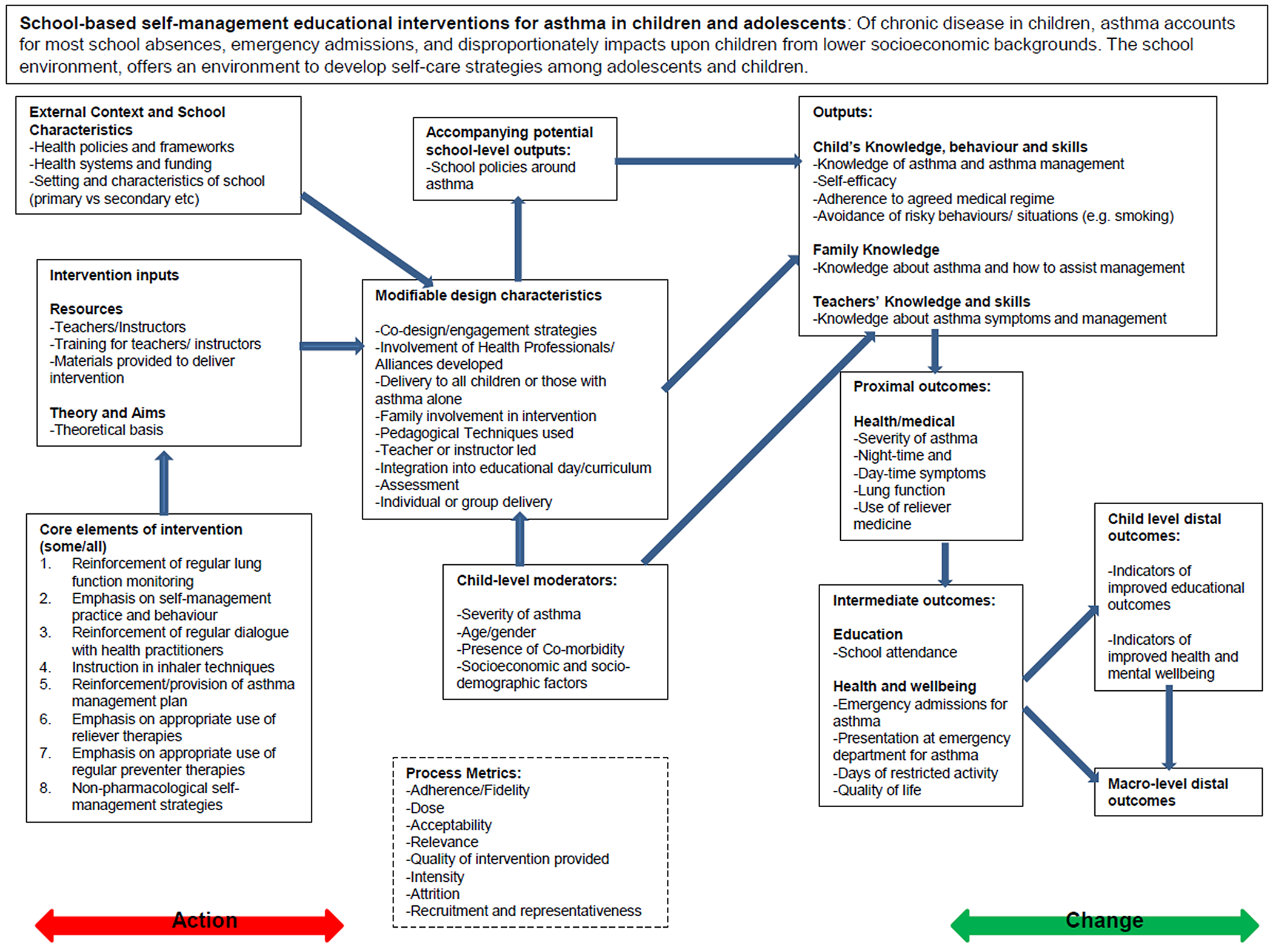
Example of a logic model for a school-based self-management educational interventions for asthma in children and adolescents.

A logic model is a hypothesized description of the causal chains in certain plans, used to show social programs and the results desired from them. They lead from inputs to outputs and then outcomes. Logic models can be considered a visualization of the relationship between actions and change in the area being evaluated. A basic narrative logic model is as follows: Input: teachers trained in child asthma; Output: children develop better skills to deal with asthma; Outcome: asthmatic children are healthier. Logic models are typically used in professional settings; however, they can be relevant outside of the workplace for personal projects.

Logic models usually take the form of a graphical depiction of the "if-then" causal relationships between the various elements leading to the outcome, but they are rarely presented in narrative form. The core of a logic model is the graphical or narrative depiction, but it also comprises relevant theories, evidence, assumptions, and beliefs that support the model and the various underlying processes.

Logic models are implemented by administrative staff in a workplace to plan and execute interventions, schemes, and programs. They are typically employed in the public sector, but are also prevalent in private firms, where they are used to organize and conduct literature reviews or for employee training purposes. The domains of application for logic models are various; waste management, poultry inspection, business education, and heart disease and stroke prevention are a few common examples. Since they are used in many contexts for different purposes, the typical components, complexity, and levels of detail in logic models vary depending on the literature in which they are found (compare for example the W.K. Kellogg Foundation presentation of the logic model, mainly aimed for evaluation, with the numerous types of logic models found in the intervention mapping framework).

== History of logic models ==
Citing Funnell and Rogers's account (2011), Joy A. Frechtling's (2015) encyclopedia article traces the underpinnings of logic models to the 1950s. Patricia J. Rogers's (2005) encyclopedia article instead traces it back to Edward A. Suchman's (1967) book on evaluative research. Both encyclopedia articles and LeCroy (2018) mention increasing interest, usage, and publications about the subject.

== Uses of the logic model ==
=== Program planning ===
One of the most important uses of the logic model is for program planning. The logic model is used to focus on the intended outcomes of a particular program. The guiding questions change from "what is being done?" to "what needs to be done?" McCawley suggests that, by using this new reasoning, a logic model for a program can be built by asking the following questions in sequence:

1. What is the current situation that we intend to impact?
2. What will it look like when we achieve the desired situation or outcome?
3. What behaviors need to change for that outcome to be achieved?
4. What knowledge or skills do people need before the behavior changes?
5. What activities need to be performed to produce the necessary learning?
6. What resources will be required to achieve the desired outcome?

By placing the focus on ultimate outcomes or results, planners can think backward through the logic model to identify how best to achieve them. Here, it helps managers to 'plan with the end in mind', rather than just consider inputs (e.g., budgets, employees) or the tasks that must be done.

Testing the logic of the model is an important step in development. If there is something the program wants to include, how will it be done? This should link to an earlier step in the logic model.

=== Evaluation ===
The logic model is often used in government or not-for-profit organizations, where the mission and vision are not focused on achieving financial benefit. Traditionally, government programs were described only in terms of their budgets. It is easy to measure the amount of money spent on a program, but this is a poor indicator of outcomes. Likewise, it is relatively easy to measure the amount of work done (e.g. number of workers or number of years spent), but the workers may have just been 'spinning their wheels' without achieving meaningful results.

However, the nature of outcomes varies. To measure progress toward outcomes, some initiatives may require an ad hoc measurement instrument. In addition, in programs such as in education or social programs, outcomes are usually long-term and may requires numerous intermediate changes (attitudes, social norm, industry practices, etc.) to advance progressively toward them.

By making the intended outcomes and the causal pathways leading to them clear, a program logic model provides the basis upon which planners and evaluators can develop a measurement plan and appropriate instruments. Instead of only looking at outcome progress, planners can open the "black box" and examine whether the intermediate outcomes progress as planned. In addition, the pathways of numerous outcomes are still largely misunderstood due to their complexity, unpredictability, and lack of scientific or practical evidence. Therefore, with proper research design, one may not only assess the progress of intermediate outcomes but also evaluate whether the program theory of change is accurate, i.e., whether successful change in an intermediate outcome provokes the hypothesized subsequent effects in the causal pathway. Finally, outcomes may be achieved through processes independent of the program, and an evaluation of those outcomes may suggest program success when, in fact, external outputs were responsible.

== Various types of logic models ==
=== The Inputs → Activities → Outputs → Outcomes template ===
Many authors and guides use the following template when discussing logic models:

Inputs	Activities	Outputs	Outcomes/impacts
what resources go into a program	what activities the program undertakes	what is produced through those activities	the changes or benefits that result from the program
e.g., money, staff, equipment	e.g., development of materials, training programs	e.g., number of booklets produced, workshops held, people trained	e.g., increased skills, knowledge, confidence, leading in the longer-term to promotion, a new job, etc.

Many refinements and variations have been added to the basic template. For example, many versions of logic models set out a series of outcomes and impacts, explaining in more detail the logic of how an intervention contributes to intended or observed results. Others often distinguish between short-term, medium-term, and long-term results, and between direct and indirect results.

=== Intervention mapping logic models ===
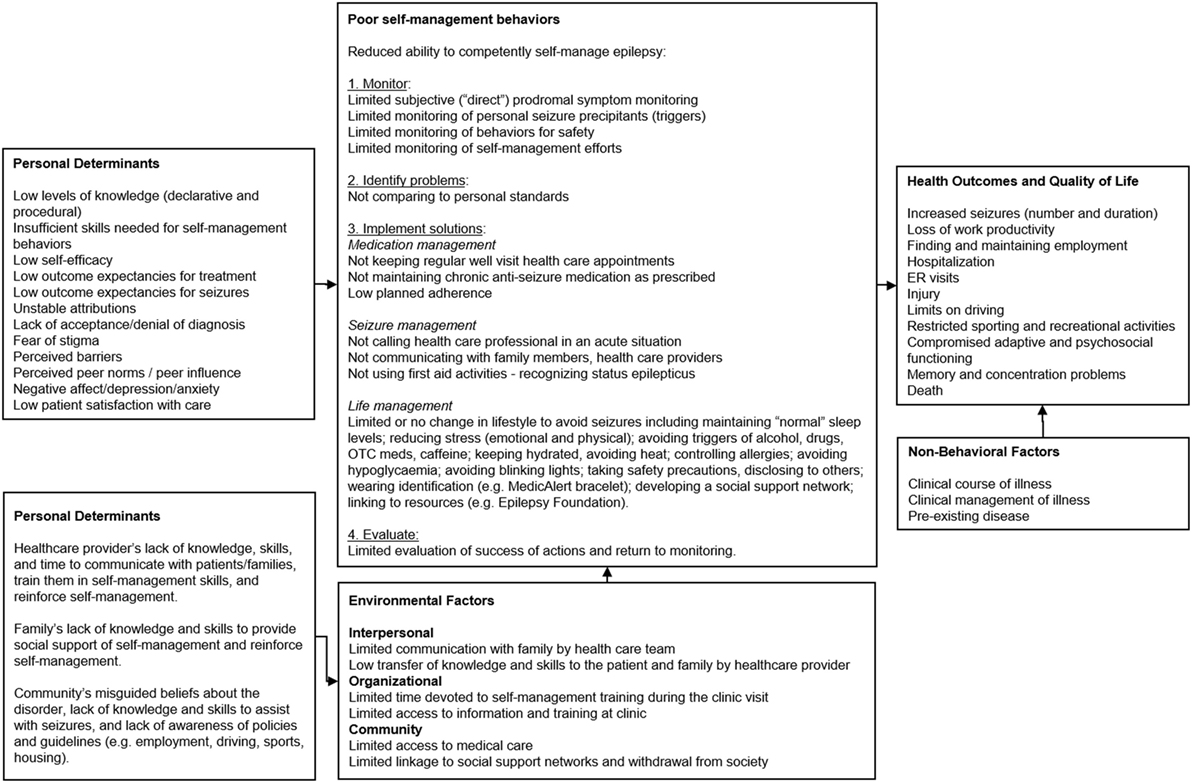
Logic Model of the Problem for Management information Decision Support Epilepsy Tool (MINDSET program) from Ruiter, DeSmet and Schneider (2007).

The intervention mapping approach of Bartholomew et al. makes extensive use of the logic model throughout the lifecycle of a health promotion program. Since this method can start from a vague desired outcome (author's example is a city whose actors decide to address "health issues" in the city), planners go through various steps to develop effective interventions and properly evaluate them. There are distinguishable but closely interwoven logic models with different purposes that can be developed during the process:

- Logic model of the problem, which is a graphical depiction of the at-risk population's social and environmental behaviors (factors) leading to the health problem and their respective causal pathways (attitudes, beliefs, skills, etc.). This may also include physical environment–related causes affecting the at-risk population, such as pollutants or a lack of physical activity infrastructure, and their respective causes, i.e., environmental agents' behaviors leading to these conditions and their causal pathways;
- Once the most relevant behaviors and causal pathways are identified, planners develop a logic model of change. This is a model of behavioral changes (performance objectives) that should occur and their corresponding necessary changes higher up in the cause-and-effect chain.
- Finally, a logic model of the intervention is developed. This model describes the various activities that will occur and the cascades of effects they are expected to produce toward the desired outcome.

Evaluators thereafter use the logic model of the intervention to design an evaluation plan to assess implementation, impact and efficiency.

=== Progressive Outcomes Scale Logic Models (POSLM) ===
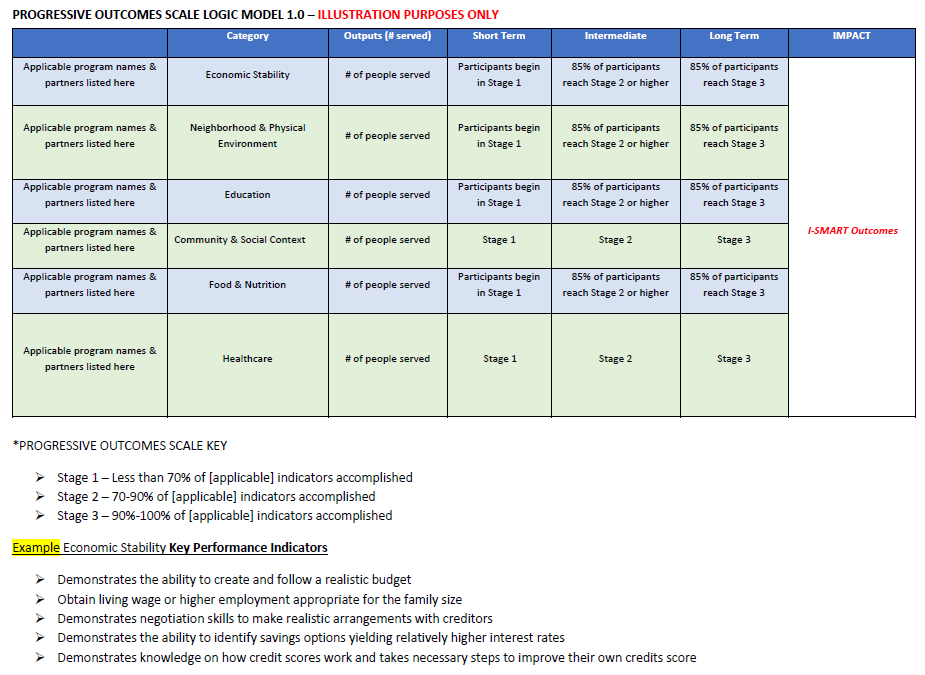
Sample Progressive Outcomes Scale Logic Model (POSLM) (2021)

The Progressive Outcomes Scale Logic Model (POSLM) approach was developed by Quisha Brown in response to the racial wealth gap [exacerbated by the COVID-19 pandemic] to help organizations address the immediate need to incorporate a racial equity focus when developing program logic models. More testing and research is needed to verify the validity of this model.

The POSLM approach makes use of the logic model with a strong focus on tracking progressive improvement toward racial disparity outcomes. To measure progress toward outcomes, this type of logic model defines short-, intermediate-, and long-term outcomes as "stage 1", "stage 2", and "stage 3". Each stage is uniquely defined and used to depict the percentage of KPIs achieved at each stage or the percentage of people who reach each stage as they progress on pre-identified key performance indicators (KPIs). These KPIs are specific to the racial disparity issues with which the population served identifies, (i.e., low reading levels, financial literacy, unemployment, etc.). To prevent the logic model itself from being cluttered with an overwhelming number of KPIs, the KPIs are arranged by category, and only the category is displayed on the logic model. The extensive list of KPIs is an appendix to the logic model. Organizations identify the KPIs and corresponding outcomes by first conducting a needs assessment and/or community focus groups. This helps to ensure that the logic model remains focused on addressing the real-time needs of people and removing racial barriers. The POSLM can help clarify the intended outcomes and the causal pathways leading to them; both of which help connect and compose a logical companion "if-then" theory of change statement. Again, more research is needed and is currently being conducted as more nonprofits, philanthropic organizations, and governments adopt this model.

== See also ==
- Theory of change
- Backcasting
- Critical theory
- Scenario planning
- Thought experiment
