= Pawson =

Pawson is a surname. Notable people with the surname include:

- Craig Pawson (born 1979), English football referee
- David Pawson (1930–2020), British Bible teacher
- Francis Pawson (1861–1921), English footballer
- Guy Pawson (1888–1986), English cricketer
- Iris Veronica Pawson (1887–1982), British novelist and non-fiction writer
- John Pawson (born 1949), British minimalist designer
- Les Pawson (1905–1992), American marathon runner
- Ray Pawson, British sociologist
- Tony Pawson (biochemist) (1952–2013), British-born Canadian molecular biologist
- Tony Pawson (cricketer) (1921–2012), English cricketer and cricket writer, son of Guy

== See also ==
- Mount Pawson, southeast of Mohn Peaks, on the east coast of Palmer Land
- Pawson Peak, solitary peak of irregular conical shape, west-northwest of Sphinx Hill, Admiralty Bay, King George Island
- Porsön
- Porson (typeface)
- Possum (disambiguation)
