= Quiz (disambiguation) =

A quiz is a game of answering questions.

Quiz may also refer to:

- Quiz (newspaper), an Australian weekly (1889–1910)
- Quiz (clothing), a British fashion retailer (founded 1993)
- Quiz (horse), a British thoroughbred (1798–1826)
- Quiz (play), a 2017 play by James Graham
  - Quiz (TV series), a 2020 TV adaptation
- Quiz (2012 film), a Dutch thriller film
- "The Quiz" (The Office), a 2001 episode of The Office
- The Quiz (DC Comics), a DC Comics character
- "Quiz!", a 2025 track by Toby Fox from Deltarune Chapters 3+4 OST from the video game Deltarune

== See also ==
- Test (disambiguation)
- Assessment (disambiguation)
- Exam (disambiguation)
- Examination (disambiguation)
