= Evaluation (disambiguation) =

Evaluation is the process of judging something or someone based on a set of standards.

Evaluation may also refer to:

== Measurement or appraisal ==
- Education:
  - Educational assessment
  - Competency evaluation (language), a means for teachers to determine the ability of their students
  - Narrative evaluation, a form of performance measurement and feedback which can be used instead of grading
- Competency evaluation (law), an assessment of the ability of a defendant to understand and rationally participate in a court process
- Formation evaluation in petroleum exploration, used to determine the commercial-viability of a potential oil or gas field
- Human resources:
  - Evaluation (workplace), a tool employers use to review the performance of an employee
  - Performance evaluation, a method by which the job performance of an employee is evaluate
  - Evaluation (basketball), a statistical formula used to rank basketball players in some European leagues
  - Evaluation camp, a program in which athletes from Canadian universities are scouted by the Canadian Football League
- Monitoring and evaluation, a process that helps governments, international organizations and NGOs improve performance and achieve results
- Program evaluation, an approach in social policy to determine if a program is effective.
- Project management:
  - Graphical Evaluation and Review Technique (GERT), a network analysis technique used in project management
  - Program Evaluation and Review Technique (PERT), a model for project management invented by US Department of Defense's US Navy Special Projects Office

== Computer science ==
- Computer process to compute the value of an expression or subroutine argument:
  - Eager evaluation or strict evaluation, the model in which an expression is evaluated as soon as it gets bound to a variable
  - eval, a function which evaluates a string as though it were an expression, or executes multiple lines of code
  - Evaluation strategy or reduction strategy, a set of rules for defining the evaluation of expressions under β-reduction
  - Lazy evaluation, a technique of delaying computation of expressions until the results of the computation are needed
  - Minimal evaluation or short circuit evaluation, an evaluation strategy in which an expression is only evaluated until the point where its final value is known
  - Partial evaluation, a technique for program optimization by specialization
  - Remote evaluation, the transmission of executable software programs from a client computer to a server computer for execution
- Evaluation function, used by game-playing programs to estimate the advantage of a position, also known as heuristic evaluation function or static evaluation function
- Appraisal of the quality of a project or product:
  - Evaluation Assurance Level (EAL) of an IT product or system, a numerical grade assigned following the completion of a Common Criteria security evaluation
  - Heuristic evaluation, a usability testing method to identify usability problems in a user interface (UI) design
  - Standard Performance Evaluation Corporation (SPEC), a non-profit organization that aims to produce fair, impartial and meaningful benchmarks for computers

== Groups or organizations ==
- 337th Test and Evaluation Squadron, the USAF's only B-1 operational test unit
- Australian Drug Evaluation Committee or ADEC, is a committee that provides independent scientific advice to the Australian Government regarding therapeutic drugs
- Defence Evaluation and Research Agency (DERA), a former part of the UK Ministry of Defence (MoD) up until 2001
- International Association for the Evaluation of Educational Achievement (IEA), an association of national research institutions and government research agencies related to education
- Operations Evaluation Department (OED), an independent unit within the World Bank

== Other uses ==
- Evaluation (journal), a quarterly peer-reviewed academic journal that covers in the field of evaluation
- Emergy evaluation, an accounting system in ecological economics, developed by Howard T. Odum and colleagues
- Immanent evaluation, a concept used by Gilles Deleuze in Nietzsche and Philosophy (1962)
- Realist Evaluation, a type of theory-driven evaluation method used in evaluating social programmes
- Registration, Evaluation and Authorisation of Chemicals (REACH), a legislation on chemical safety in the European Union
- Function evaluation, in mathematics

== See also ==
- Appraisal (disambiguation)
- Evaluation map (disambiguation) (in mathematics)
