= Tony Pawson =

Tony Pawson may refer to:

- Tony Pawson (biochemist) (1952–2013), British-born Canadian genetic scientist
- Tony Pawson (cricketer) (1921–2012), English cricketer and cricket journalist
