= Estimate (disambiguation) =

An estimate is an approximation based on incomplete information.

Estimate may also refer to:

- Estimates, annual preliminary budget forecasts in the Westminster system of government
- Sales quote, estimate of cost provided to a potential buyer
- Appraisal (disambiguation), estimate of price provided to a potential seller
- Upper and lower bounds in mathematics
- Estimate (horse), a racehorse foaled in 2009
- Estimate (card game), also called Oh Hell, Oh Pshaw or Nomination Whist
- Estimate of the Situation (Project Sign), a 1948 claimed U.S. government report on UFOs
