= Examination =

Examination may refer to:

- Physical examination, a medical procedure
- Questioning and more specific forms thereof, for example in law:
  - Cross-examination
  - Direct examination
- Exam as assessment, also "test", "exams", "evaluation"
  - Entrance examination
    - Civil service entrance examination
      - Imperial examination
- Examination (Better Days), song from the 2019 Chinese drama film Better Days
- Examination (Change song), from the 1985 album Turn on Your Radio
- "Examination" (Not Going Out), a 2012 television episode

== See also ==
- Analysis
- Appraisal (disambiguation)
- Assessment (disambiguation)
- Evaluation
- Evaluation (disambiguation)
- Exam (disambiguation)
- Investigation (disambiguation)
- Study (disambiguation)
