= Huey-tsyh Chen =

Professor in public health and program evaluation

Huey-tsyh Chen is a Taiwanese American sociologist and scholar of program evaluation. He is Professor in the Department of Public Health and Director of the Center for Evaluation and Applied Research at Mercer University.

== Life ==
Huey-tsyh Chen was born in Taiwan. He received his PhD in sociology from the University of Massachusetts, supervised by Peter Rossi. He has worked at the University of Akron and the University of Alabama at Birmingham. He also served as branch chief and senior evaluation scientist at the U.S. Centers for Disease Control and Prevention (CDC), where he led the development of a national evaluation system for evaluating CDC-funded HIV prevention programs.

Chen is best known for his contributions to the theory and methodology of program evaluation, particularly theory-driven evaluation (often seen as a type of theory-based evaluation), about which he wrote the first comprehensive book.

In 1993 Chen was the recipient of the Paul F. Lazarsfeld Award for contributions to Evaluation Theory from the American Evaluation Association.

== Theory-driven evaluation ==
Theory-driven evaluation begins with the premise that social programs are attempts to intervene on some aspect of society to solve social problems and do so using a program theory, though one that is "frequently implicit or unsystematic". The approach was developed in response to "black-box" evaluation, which tended to focus on research methods rather than attempting to understand the mechanisms through which a program might work. Key reasons for this include learning from null results and to improve the implementation of successful programs. Chen distinguishes between normative theory, specifying, for instance, the goals of the program, and causal theory, which specifies how the program is thought to work, and argues that both are required for evaluation. Further clues on what kind of theory is intended come from a paper Chen authored with Peter Rossi:

the kind of theory we have in mind is not the global conceptual schemes of the grand theorists, but much more prosaic theories that are concerned with how human organizations work and how social problems are generated. It advances evaluation practice very little to adopt one or another of current global theories in attacking, say, the problem of juvenile delinquency, but it does help a great deal to understand the authority structure in schools and the mechanisms of peer group influence and parental discipline in designing and evaluating a program that is supposed to reduce disciplinary problems in schools. [...T]he theory-driven perspective is closer to what econometricians call "model specification" than are more complicated and more abstract and general theories.

It has been thought that theory-driven evaluation focussed on statistical approaches such as path analysis. However, Chen has also made case for the importance of qualitative methods, particularly when developing program theories.

== Selected works ==
=== Books ===
- Theory-driven evaluations. Thousand Oaks, CA: Sage. 1990.
- Practical program evaluation: Assessing and improving planning, implementation, and effectiveness. Newbury Park, CA: Sage. 2005.
- Practical program evaluation: Theory-driven evaluation and the integrated evaluation perspective (2nd ed.). Sage Publications. 2015.

=== Articles ===
- (with P. H. Rossi) "The multi-goal, theory-driven approach to evaluation: A model linking basic and applied social sciences". Social Forces. 59: 106–122. 1980. doi:10.2307/2577835. JSTOR 2577835.
- (with P. H. Rossi) "Evaluating with sense: The theory-driven approach". Evaluation Review. 7: 283–302. 1983. doi:10.1177/0193841X8300700301.
- (with P. H. Rossi) "The theory-driven approach to validity". Evaluation and Program Planning. 10: 95–103. 1987. doi:10.1016/0149-7189(87)90025-5.
- "Development of a National Evaluation System to Evaluate CDC-Funded Health Department HIV Prevention Programs". American Journal of Evaluation. 22: 55–70. 2001. doi:10.1177/109821400102200106.
- (with L. Morosanu and Victor H. Chen) "Program Plan Evaluation: A Participatory Approach to Bridge Plan Evaluation and Program Evaluation". American Journal of Evaluation. 45: 551–561. 2024.
