= Regulatory impact analysis =

Document created before a new government regulation is introduced

A regulatory impact analysis or regulatory impact assessment (RIA) is a document created before a new government regulation is introduced. RIAs are produced in many countries, although their scope, content, role and influence on policy making vary.

== Role ==
The role of an RIA is to provide a detailed and systematic appraisal of the potential impacts of a new regulation in order to assess whether the regulation is likely to achieve the desired objectives. The need for RIA arises from the fact that regulation commonly has numerous impacts and that these are often difficult to foresee without detailed study and consultation with affected parties. Economic approaches to the issue of regulation also emphasize the high risk that regulatory costs may exceed benefits. From this perspective, the central purpose of RIA is to ensure that regulation will be welfare-enhancing from the societal viewpoint - that is, that benefits will exceed costs. RIA is generally conducted in a comparative context, with different means of achieving the objective sought being analysed and the results compared.

== History and development ==
The first RIAs are generally considered to be the "inflation impact assessments" required by the Carter Administration in the United States from 1978. The RIA requirement was broadened during the Reagan administration, with benefit–cost analysis becoming the required methodological approach. Another early adopter of a RIA requirement was Australia (1985). By the mid-1990s approximately 12 OECD countries had implemented RIA requirements of some form, although the scope of the required analysis varied considerably. By 2000, 20 of 28 OECD countries had implemented RIA requirements. Currently, virtually all OECD countries use RIA. RIA requirements had also begun to be strongly promoted to its client countries by the World Bank. As a result, an increasing number of developing countries have now adopted RIA requirements.

RIA requirements have broadened in scope over time in many countries in which they have been adopted. Conversely, few if any countries have abandoned the use of RIA after having adopted it.

== Australia ==
In Australia, all decisions of Government, and all national/sub-national decision making forums, are subject to the RIA process and proposals which have 'more than minor' regulatory impacts require the completion of a Regulation Impact Statement (RIS). The RIA framework is administered by the Office of Impact Analysis within the Department of the Prime Minister and Cabinet. Australia was one of the first adopters of RIA, with impact analysis requirements established for Cabinet decisions as early as 1985. The RIS process works to ensure that a high-quality evidence-base supports major decisions of the Government.

In Australia, the RIS process involves extensive analysis of the underlying policy problem, the presentation and impact analysis of at least three viable solutions, and comprehensive stakeholder consultation. Policy proposals must also quantify the regulatory burden on individuals, businesses, and community organisations under the viable options. Following announcement of a decision, the impact analysis used to support Government decision-making is published online, as is OIA's assessment of the quality of that analysis and the processes undertaken, for transparency purposes.

== Canada ==
In Canada, almost all new federal regulations are required to have a regulatory impact analysis statement (RIAS). A RIAS is made up of six parts: description, alternatives, benefits and costs, consultation, compliance and enforcement, and contact.

== EU ==
The European Commission introduced an impact assessment system in 2002, integrating and replacing previous single-sector type of assessments. In the European Commission perspective, Impact Assessment (IA) is a process aimed at structuring and supporting the development of policies. It identifies and assesses the problem at stake and the objectives pursued. It identifies the main options for achieving the objective and analyses their likely impacts in the economic, environmental and social fields. It outlines advantages and disadvantages of each option and examines possible synergies and trade-offs. In 2005 and 2006 the Commission updated its approach to include economic, social and environmental dimensions, thus moving In the direction of Sustainability Impact Assessment. There has also been a 2009 update.

== UK ==
In the United Kingdom, RIAs have for many years been a key tool in helping improve the quality of regulation and reduce unnecessary burdens on business. RIAs have been produced by Central Government departments for many years using guidance produced by the Better Regulation Executive (BRE) in the Cabinet Office. In May 2007 a new system of Impact Assessments (IAs) was introduced and made fully operational in November 2007. BRE, now part of DBERR is responsible for the IA process.

The aim of IAs is to help improve policy making by placing a greater emphasis on quantifying benefits and costs in the IA. The removal of the word 'Regulatory' was also a recognition that many Government burdens on business, the third sector and public bodies were not always implemented as legislation or regulations e.g. codes of practice, reporting requirements or funding guidance, and that the impacts of these measures also needed to be assessed.

== See also ==
- Economic appraisal
