= Tech Trust =

British social enterprise

Charity Digital
- Founded: 2001
- Type: Charity, Social Enterprise
- Registration no.: 1133179
- Location: London, England
- Key people: Charles Mindenhall (Chairman); Vacant (Chief Executive)
- Website: https://charitydigital.org.uk/
- Formerly called: Charity Technology Trust, Technology Trust, tt-Exchange

Charity Digital, formerly Charity Technology Trust, Technology Trust and Tech Trust) is a UK-based charity and social enterprise that aims to help other charities and not-for-profit organisations increase their impact through more effective use of Information Technology.

Charity Digital partners with tech companies, nonprofit organisations and funders to deliver free educational content and affordable events training programmes. They also provide access to discounted software, an email marketing service, a payment gateway service, and a foreign exchange currency service. They currently work with more than 30,000 charities and have saved the charity sector over £200 million through discounted software procurement and other programmes.

== Services ==
- Helpful, curated and current content on a range of relevant topics, ranging from fundraising and grants, to Cyber and AI
- Events sponsored by key partners, helping you to access the latest technological thinking and innovation
- Charity Digital Academy training courses: Expert-led courses aimed to enhance your hard- and soft-skills, on topics ranging from AI to email marketing, with new courses released monthly
- Access to a selection of discounted software, including:
  - Avast Cyber Security - award-winning cyber care at charitable rates
  - Dotdigital Email Marketing Platform - exclusive discounts and support
  - Tailored direct debit solutions – to drive donations and lotteries
  - 10% off refurbished hardware from Computers 4 Charities

== History ==
Peter Sweatman founded Tech Trust (known then as Charity Technology Trust) to bring together key players in the charity, business and technology sectors. Among the initial supporters of Charity Technology Trust (CTT) were Charles Dunstone, Peter Wheeler, Lord Joel Joffe, Tessa Baring and Michael Young, Baron Young of Dartington.

The charity's first initiative was CTT Raffles, which provided online raffling technology to UK charities. The CTT Raffles platform was supported by James Redhead, and offered a tailored online raffling engine, along with data capture, collation and processing of entries and marketing support. It launched in May 2001 with the support of Oxfam, Guide Dogs for the Blind, Barnardo's, PDSA and the National Trust.

In 2003, the charity branched out into e-communications, offering a charity email service that allowed leading charities to make a number of email marketing campaigns throughout the year. In 2008, they partnered with dotmailer to offer a new, low-cost email marketing system to charities and not-for-profits. The service was known as CTTMail, but has since been rebranded to tt-mail.

In 2006, Charity Technology Trust joined the global software donation programme run by TechSoup to deliver Microsoft’s donation programme in the UK. The scheme is open to all UK registered charities, who pay an administration fee, usually of between 4 and 8 per cent of retail price. CTT was already providing Cisco donated products through an online shop on its CTXchange website (now tt-exchange). Since then, the programme has expanded to include a number of different digital technology partners.

In October 2013, Charity Technology Trust (CTT) changed its name to Technology Trust. In October 2017, the name was changed again to Tech Trust. The registered charity name and company name has remained the same. As of 2019, the company is now called Charity Digital.

UK-based charities used to access discounted and donated products through the "Charity Digital Exchange", the UK-based subsidiary of the global network TechSoup, run by Charity Digital. From 1st July 2025, the Charity Digital Exchange product catalogue that was previously hosted by Charity Digital was transitioned to be managed directly by TechSoup UK. TechSoup, continue to provide many of the same discounted products that were available to charities under the previous branding of "Charity Digital Exchange".

== Awards ==
In August 2012, the charity was shortlisted for two Charity Times Awards. Their partnership with Microsoft was selected for the Corporate National Partnership Champion category, and the partnership between CTT, SCIE (Social Care Institute for Excellence) and Lasa on the Get Connected project has also been recognised, with the project being named as one of six finalists in the Cross-Sector Partnership of the Year category

== Bibliography ==
- Microsoft Press Release 8 May 2012 - Donating software to UK charities to improve their community impact
- Nominet Trust - Our top tips on what charities' can do in the online space
- Guardian Voluntary Sector Network, 11 May 2012 - Are you preparing to vacate the office during the Olympics?
