= Investigation =

Investigation or Investigations may refer to:

== Law enforcement ==
- Investigation, the work of a detective
- Investigation, the work of a private investigator
- Investigation, the work of an insurance adjuster
- Investigation, to identify the cause of an explosion
- Investigation, to identify the cause of a traffic collision, railway accident, airplane crash, or other transportation accident
- Criminal investigation, the study of facts, used to identify, locate and prove the guilt or innocence of an accused person or organization
- Criminal investigation department, the branch of British Police force to which plainclothes detectives belong
- Federal Bureau of Investigation, the primary investigative arm of the US Department of Justice
- Fire investigation, analysis of fire-related incidents and to determine if arson was involved
- Tax investigation

== Medicine ==
- Clinical trial, an investigation conducted to collect data for new drugs or devices
- Investigational New Drug, a category in a USFDA program
- Outbreak Investigation

== Science and maths ==
- Forensic science investigation, in fields such as accounting, science, engineering and information technology
- Investigations in Numbers, Data, and Space, a K-5 mathematics curriculum

== Arts, entertainment, and media ==
=== Literature ===
- The Investigation, a 1959 book by Stanisław Lem
- The Investigation (play), a 1965 play by Peter Weiss

=== Television ===
- "Investigations" (Star Trek: Voyager), an episode of the television series Star Trek: Voyager
- Investigation (TV channel), a Canadian French-language specialty channel
- The Investigation (TV series), a 2020 six-part Danish TV series
- Investigation Discovery, a digital cable channel

=== Other uses in arts, entertainment, and media ===
- "Investigations", a 2009 song by Kevin MacLeod
- Investigate (magazine), a New Zealand current affairs magazine
- Investigation (film), a 2006 Bulgarian drama
- Investigative journalism, the practice of in-depth reporting or analysis
- Temporal Investigations, an agency of the government of the United Federation of Planets in the fictional universe of Star Trek

== See also ==
- Background investigation, an investigation into an individual's past
- Congressional investigation, an inquiry run by a congressional committee
- Discovery (observation), the act of detecting something new, or something "old" that had been unrecognized as meaningful
- Examination (disambiguation)
- Forensic science, in fields such as accounting, science, engineering and information technology
- Investigator (disambiguation)
- Research
