= Harvey McGrath =

British businessman (born 1952)

Sir Harvey McGrath
- Born: Harvey Andrew McGrath; 23 February 1952 (age 74); Belfast, Northern Ireland
- Education: Methodist College Belfast; St Catharine's College, Cambridge
- Occupation: Business executive
- Spouse: Allison McGrath
- Children: 2

Sir Harvey Andrew McGrath (born 23 February 1952) is a British business and philanthropy executive. He served as the Chairman of the Man Group from 2000 to 2007 and Prudential plc from 2009 to 2012. He is the co-founder of Revere Capital Advisors, a hedge fund based in New York City and London. He serves as the Chairman of Big Society Capital and Heart of the City, promoting philanthropy in Greater London and the City of London.

== Early life ==
Harvey McGrath was born in Belfast, Northern Ireland, United Kingdom. He was educated at Methodist College Belfast, a grammar school in Belfast. He joined St Catharine's College, Cambridge, a constituent college of the University of Cambridge in 1971, where he received a Master of Arts degree in geography.

== Business career ==
He started his career as a commodity lender at Chase Manhattan Bank shortly after graduation, first in London, moving to New York City in 1979. He joined the Man Group in 1980, where he worked as treasurer, finance director, and later president of Man Inc., all of which were based in New York City. He then moved back to London to serve as its chief executive from 1990 to 2000, and as its chairman from 2000 to 2007.

He joined the board of directors of Prudential plc in September 2008. He served as its chairman from January 2009 to June 2012. During his tenure, he oversaw a failed bid to acquire AIA Group Limited for £22.6 billion, which was unpopular with the Financial Services Authority and shareholders.

In 2008, he co-founded Revere Capital Advisors, an investment business based in New York City and London, with two of his former Man Group co-workers: Daniel Barnett, formerly Finance Director, and John Kinder, formerly Head of Global Sugar Trading.

== Philanthropy ==
He is the chairman emeritus of the East London Business Alliance and London First. He served as the vice-chairman of the Mayor of London's Skills and Employment Board from 2006 to 2011. He was then appointed by Mayor Boris Johnson as the chairman of the London Development Agency. He was appointed as the co-chair of the Mayor of London's Enterprise Panel in July 2011. He served as a governor of Tower Hamlets College, a college of further education in the London Borough of Tower Hamlets. He has supported research into philanthropic activity.

He is a co-founder of New Philanthropy Capital and serves on its board of trustees. In 2014, he became the chair of the Big Society Capital, formerly chaired by Sir Ronald Cohen. He is also the chairman of Heart of the City. Additionally, he is the former chairman of the board of trustees of The Prince's Teaching Institute, one of The Prince's Charities.; former chairman of the board of Governors of Birkbeck, University of London.; former president of the board of trustees of Children and Families Across Borders (CFAB), a non-profit organisation which offers protection to children who are separated from their families overseas.; and former chairman of the board of trustees of the charity icould (www.icould.com) (note 23 below) website for 12- to 18-year-olds to find out more about job opportunities. He also serves on the advisory board of Bridges Ventures and the Sutton Trust.

He has supported the Integrated Education Fund in Northern Ireland, which builds schools where both Catholic and Protestant schoolchildren are enrolled in an attempt to bridge religious gaps. He has served on the boards of trustees of the Royal Anniversary Trust, which is responsible for the Queen's Anniversary Prize. He has also been a member of the Richard House Society, the philanthropic arm of the Richard House Children's Hospital, and a patron of the Royal Society of Arts. He was the recipient of an honorary degree from Queen's University Belfast in 2008 and a Doctor of the University (DUniv) from the University of Ulster in 2009. He was the recipient of the Beacon Fellowship from the UK Community Foundations for his philanthropic work in 2013.

He has made charitable contributions to his alma mater, the Methodist College Belfast. He has also made charitable contributions to the University of Cambridge and to St Catharine's College. For example, he donated £4 million to improve access for students from disadvantaged backgrounds in 2008. In February 2014, the college unveiled The McGrath Centre, a conference building erected as a result of a significant charitable gift made by McGrath.

With his wife, he has also made charitable contributions to the Unicorn Theatre in the London Borough of Southwark, the Guildhall School of Music and Drama in the City of London, the Almeida Theatre in Islington, the Great Ormond Street Hospital in Bloomsbury, and the National Portrait Gallery, London. They also made a charitable gift to the Lyric Theatre, Belfast, which led to the dedication of the McGrath Suite, named in their honour.

McGrath was knighted in the 2016 New Year Honours for services to economic growth and public life.

== Personal life ==
He is married to Allison McGrath. They have two children. As of 2014, he was worth an estimated £100 million.
