= Arthur Sealy =

English cricketer (1903–44)

Personal information
- Full name: Arthur John Edmund Sealy
- Born: 30 November 1903; Woolwich, Kent, England
- Died: 11 November 1944 (aged 40); Portsmouth, Hampshire, England
- Batting: Right-handed
- Bowling: Right-arm medium
- Relatives: Arthur Pawson (stepfather)

Domestic team information
- Years: Team
- 1924: Oxford University

Career statistics
Competition	First-class
Matches	8
Runs scored	62
Batting average	15.50
100s/50s	–/–
Top score	17*
Balls bowled	1,128
Wickets	20
Bowling average	27.35
5 wickets in innings	–
10 wickets in match	–
Best bowling	3/25
Catches/stumpings	6/–
- Source: Cricinfo, 7 June 2020

Arthur John Edmund Sealy (30 November 1903 – 11 November 1944) was an English first-class cricketer.

Sealy was born at Woolwich in November 1903. He was educated at Winchester College, before going up to Brasenose College, Oxford. While studying at Oxford, he played first-class cricket for Oxford University in 1924, making eight appearances. Sealy scored a total of 62 runs in his eight matches, with a high score of 17 not out. With his right-arm medium pace bowling, he took 20 wickets at an average of 27.35 and best figures of 3 for 25. Sealy died at Portsmouth in November 1944, having spent many years in an asylum for the insane. His stepfather, Arthur Clive Pawson, also played first-class cricket.
