= Arthur Pawson =

English cricketer, soldier and solicitor

Personal information
- Full name: Arthur Clive Pawson
- Born: 5 January 1882; Bramley, Yorkshire, England
- Died: 14 August 1969 (aged 87); Nynehead, Somerset, England
- Batting: Right-handed
- Relatives: Guy Pawson (brother); Tony Pawson (nephew); Arthur Sealy (stepson)

Domestic team information
- Years: Team
- 1903: Oxford University

Career statistics
Competition	First-class
Matches	7
Runs scored	177
Batting average	14.75
100s/50s	–/1
Top score	55
Catches/stumpings	5/–
- Source: Cricinfo, 4 April 2020

Clive Pawson (5 January 1882 – 14 August 1969) was an English first-class cricketer, solicitor and British Army officer.

The son of Albert Henry Pawson, he was born at the Leeds suburb of Bramley in January 1882. He was educated at Winchester College, before going up to Christ Church, Oxford. While studying at Oxford, he played first-class cricket for Oxford University in 1903, making seven appearances. He scored 177 runs in his seven matches, at an average of 14.75 and a high score of 55, which came against the Marylebone Cricket Club at Oxford.

After graduating from Oxford, he became a solicitor based in Manchester. He served in the Sherwood Rangers Yeomanry, being commissioned as a second lieutenant in February 1912; he had previously been a private with the Inns of Court Officers' Training Corps. He served with the Sherwood Rangers in the First World War, being promoted to lieutenant one month into the conflict. He was seconded for embarkation duties in July 1915, during which he was made a temporary captain in October 1915. By August 1916, he was serving as a railway transport officer. He gained the full rank of captain in May 1917 and returned to the Sherwood Rangers following the war, in February 1919. He was demobilised in September 1921, but retained the rank of captain. Pawson died in August 1969 at Nynehead, Somerset. His brother, Guy, played first-class cricket, as did his nephew Tony Pawson and stepson Arthur Sealy.
