= Appraisal =

Appraisal or appraise may refer to:

== Decision-making ==
- Appraisal (decision analysis), a decision method
- Archival appraisal, process for determining which records need to be kept, and for how long
- Project appraisal, comparing options to deliver an objective
- Economic appraisal, an appraisal based on comparison of monetary equivalents

== Property valuation ==
- Real estate appraisal, the practice of determining the value of real property
- Business valuation, the process of determining the value of businesses
- Art valuation, the process of determining the value of works of art
- Domain appraisal, the act of evaluating the worth of a specific domain name
- Archival appraisal, the appraisal of archival collections in libraries
- Appraisal value, the value of a company based on a projection of future cash flow

== Other uses ==
- Appraisal (discourse analysis), the ways that writers or speakers express approval or disapproval for things or ideas
- Appraisal theory, a psychological theory of emotion and cognition
- Appraisal Institute, an international association of professional real estate appraisers
- Performance appraisal, a method to evaluate employee performance
- "Appraisals" (The Office), a 2002 television episode
- "Appraise", song on the Judas and the Black Messiah film soundtrack

== See also ==
- Appraiser
- Evaluation (disambiguation)
