= New Philanthropy Capital =

- Founded: 2002; 24 years ago
- Type: Charitable organisation, think tank and consultancy
- Purpose: Social sector
- Location: 93, Great Suffolk Street, London, SE1 0BX
- Chief Executive: Jonathan Simmons
- Employees: 40
- Website: www.thinkNPC.org

New Philanthropy Capital (NPC) is a charitable organisation based in London, United Kingdom. It describes itself as "the think tank and consultancy for the social sector." NPC aims to help charities, foundations, philanthropists, impact investors, social enterprises, corporates, and the public sector to maximise social impact in the lives of the people they serve.

As a think tank, NPC conducts research and produces reports on social issues and the role that the social sector can play in tackling them, primarily in the United Kingdom. Previous NPC think tank projects have focussed on homelessness, criminal justice, COVID-19, loneliness, mental health, young people, education, health and disability. The Guardian has described NPC's reports as of "indisputable" value. NPC's research has been funded by grant-makers including the Big Lottery Fund, Lloyds TSB Foundations and the Sainsbury Family Charitable Trusts.

As a consultancy, it helps donors make more informed decisions on how to give and has been called "the equivalent of an equity-research firm for the philanthropic marketplace." NPC also works with charities, helping them to improve their processes and developing tools, such as theories of change, to enable them to measure their own effectiveness. Other key areas of expertise include strategy development, the use of data and digital in the social sector, user involvement, learning partnerships and systems change approaches. On its website, NPC says of its consultancy services: "Making a positive difference isn’t easy. Whether you’re a charity or funder, social enterprise or philanthropist, private sector or public sector body, our team of charity experts can help."

== History ==
NPC started as a charitable organisation in 2002, and was founded by Peter Wheeler and Gavin Davies, two ex-Goldman Sachs employees, as an attempt to fill a gap in the philanthropic market. Other co-founders were Peter Sweatman, then vice-president of JPMorgan, and hedge fund manager Harvey McGrath. Peter Wheeler was also an early supporter of Technology Trust. As of 2021, NPC has approximately forty members of staff.

NPC is one of a small number of organisations offering advice on philanthropy, including the Institute for Philanthropy.

== See also ==
- Altruism
- Philanthropy
- Charitable organisation
- GiveWell
- Giving What We Can
