= Children and Families Across Borders =

United Kingdom charity

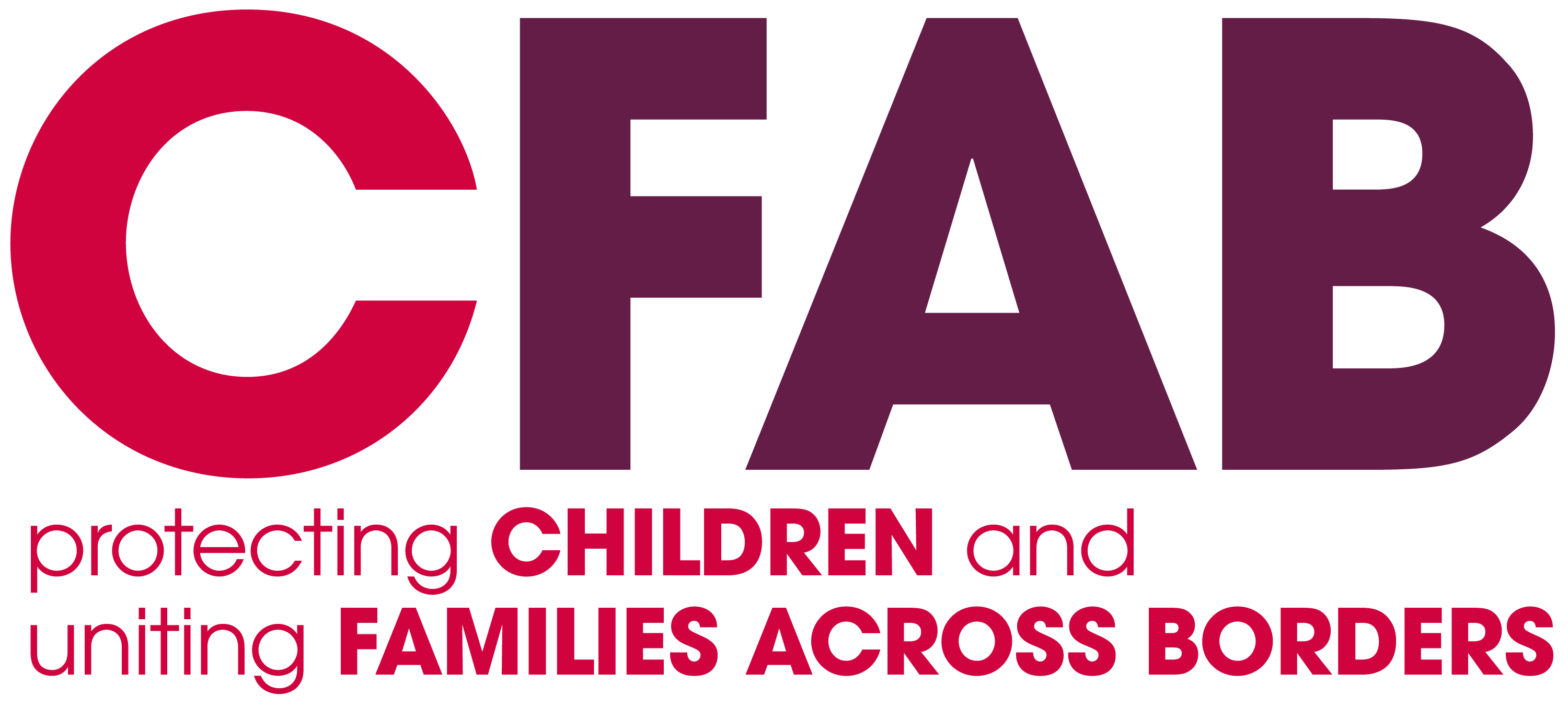
CFAB Logo

Children and Families Across Borders (CFAB) is a national charity founded (as International Social Service UK) in 1955 that provides advice in resolving international child protection cases.

CFAB is the only charity in the UK which provides international child protection social services. It works with local authorities in the UK to help professionals navigate social care systems abroad. It also works with children and families to help understand their situations and ensure that the child’s best interests are protected. It works in cooperation with local authorities, the courts, the police and other agencies. Services include assessments, record checks and welfare visits, among others.

As the UK arm of the Geneva-based International Social Service (ISS), CFAB has access to a worldwide network of professionals and partners in over 120 countries. The ISS is accredited to the United Nations Economic and Social Council (ECOSOC).

At the core of CFAB’s work, and that of the International Social Service network globally, is ensuring that children who are separated from families across international borders are given adequate care and protection.

== History ==
CFAB was founded in 1955 as the UK branch of the International Social Service Network, known as 'ISS GB' or 'ISS UK'. It was originally established to deal with the social impact of numerous global events throughout the 1950s. In 2009, the charity changed its name to 'Children and Families Across Borders.'

In 2010, after several years of assisting with Libyan Family Reunifications, CFAB was responsible for arranging the high-profile reunification of parents with children who had been abducted and taken to Libya.

== Present day ==
Between 2008 and 2016, CFAB was first funded through the Department for Children, Schools and Families, and later through the Department for Education to provide the UK’s only free national advice line, providing consultations to UK-based professionals managing international child protection cases. Despite the Voluntary and Community Sector funding route closing in 2016, CFAB continues to operate this advice line free of charge and, to date, have helped almost 300,000 children through this service.

In 2010, CFAB was asked to give evidence to the UK Parliamentary Education Committee, on the child protection service in England.

In the 3 months prior to the 2012 London Olympic Games, CFAB trained over 700 professionals on issues of child trafficking in order to prepare the workforce.

CFAB has campaigned on a number of issues. These have included:

- Child trafficking
- 'Miracle baby' trafficking
- 'Invisible children'
- Female genital mutilation (FGM)
- Issues surrounding overseas adoption

CFAB, along with its ISS partners from Bulgaria and Germany, participated in the 9th European Forum on the rights of the child in Brussels.

In 2019, CFAB gave evidence to the Kinship Care Parliamentary Taskforce to raise awareness about children in kinship care and highlight the risks, challenges and solutions in international kinship placements.

In the wake of Brexit, CFAB has published guidance on the implications of the UK leaving the European Union on issues of child protection and has offered solutions regarding safeguarding children post-Brexit.

CFAB is a prominent member of the Refugee Children's Consortium (RCC), a group of NGOs working collaboratively to ensure that the rights and needs of refugee children are promoted, respected and met in accordance with the relevant domestic, regional and international standards. In 2016, at the request of the Home Office, CFAB was a key participant in addressing the resettlement of children from the refugee camp in Calais into the UK.

As of 2019, CFAB has been offering dedicated post-placement support to families who have been reunited in the UK across international borders, via Dublin III or other immigration routes. The post placement support project provides advice, and practical and emotional guidance and assistance for whole families in this situation, helping them to stick together where this is beneficial, understand their rights, and achieve their full potential.

In 2020, CFAB celebrated its 65th anniversary.

== Research ==
In 2018, CFAB published research into international placements and cross-border child safeguarding which reveals that 1 in 4 children who are placed abroad continue to be at risk of abuse or neglect. This research has demonstrated the need for post-placement support and highlighted that further research must be conducted into the long-term outcomes of children placed with family internationally.

Launched in 2020, in collaboration with other child protection agencies, CFAB published the first-of-its-kind International Kinship Care Guide which outlines good practice for professionals placing children from local authority care with family members abroad. CFAB estimate that more than 18,000 children in local authority care in England and Wales have family members who could act as their potential careers. The guide has been widely praised for its comprehensive approach.

== Governance ==
CFAB is governed by a Board of Trustees chaired by Michael Phair. Its CEO is Carolyn Housman and its President is Douglas Lewis. It has its head office in London.

Prominent Trustees include; Dr David N. Jones, Christopher Hames QC and Richard Morris MBE

Between 2010 and 2014 Douglas Lewis CBE served as Chair of the Board of Trustees.

== Patronage ==
Since 2000 CFAB's Royal Patron has been Princess Alexandra of Kent.

Other current patrons include:

- Dalal Al-Duwaisan, wife of Khaled Al-Duwaisan
- Monir Sattaripour
- Sir Harvey McGrath
- Steve Rider
- Baroness Scotland of Asthal
