= Alice S. Rossi =

Sociologist and feminist

- Born: Alice Emma Schaerr; September 24, 1922; Brooklyn, New York
- Died: November 3, 2009 (aged 87); Northampton, Massachusetts
- Occupation: Sociologist
- Spouse: Peter H. Rossi (1951–2006)

Alice Emma Rossi (née Schaerr; September 24, 1922 – November 3, 2009) was an American feminist and sociologist.

== Biography ==
Her scholarship focused on the status of women at work, in the family, and their sexual life. Her writings helped to build the foundations of the feminist movement. Her early advocacy of abortion and reproductive rights caused her to gain a lot of national attention. One of her main academic pursuits was the study of people's lifecourse from youth to older age, particularly in the case of women.

One of her most influential feminist articles was “Equality Between the Sexes: An Immodest Proposal.” First presented in 1963 at a meeting of the American Academy of Arts and Sciences, it was published the next year in the academy's journal Daedalus. In the article, Rossi argued that for most women motherhood had become a full-time occupation, a state of affairs that hurt not only women but also the larger society in which they lived. For the well-being of both the women and the culture, she wrote, parity of the sexes is essential.

This article's publication coincided with the publication the same year of The Feminine Mystique by Betty Friedan, which dealt with similar issues. Rossi's argument was considered subversive at the time. Her article can be found in the anthology “Life Cycle and Achievement in America” (Harper & Row, 1969), edited by Rose Laub Coser.

In later work, also controversial, Professor Rossi argued that the cultural divide between men and women was not the product of socialization alone, as the prevailing view held, but was partly rooted in inborn biological differences between the sexes.

Professor Rossi held appointments at Harvard, the University of Chicago, Johns Hopkins University and Goucher College before finally joining the University of Massachusetts faculty, where she was appointed the Harriet Martineau professor of sociology. She remained there from 1974 until her retirement in 1991, at which point she became an emerita professor. She also was the 74th president of the American Sociological Association.

== Major publications ==
- Generational Differences in the Soviet Union (1957)
- The Feminist Papers: From Adams to de Beauvoir (1973, editor)
- Seasons of a Woman’s Life: A Self-Reflective Essay on Love and Work in Family, Profession, and Politics (1983)
- Gender and the Life Course (1985, editor)
- Of Human Bonding: Parent-Child Relations Across the Life Course (1990)
- Sexuality Across the Life Course (1994, editor)
- Caring and Doing for Others: Social Responsibility in the Domains of Family, Work and Community (2001, editor)
