= Revere Capital Advisors =

- Industry: Hedge fund
- Founded: 2008
- Headquarters: New York City and London, United States and United Kingdom
- Website: revereglobal.com

Revere Capital Advisors is a hedge fund based in New York City and London.

== Locations ==
The firm has two locations. In New York City, it is located at 12 East 52nd Street on the island of Manhattan. In London, it is located at 3, Hill Street in Mayfair.

== History ==
Revere Capital Advisors was established in 2008. Its co-founders are former executives at the Man Group: Harvey McGrath, formerly Chairman, Daniel Barnett, formerly Finance Director, and John Kinder, formerly Head of Global Sugar Trading.

Initial fund holdings came from Broadmark Asset Management, a fund based in San Francisco, and Dickson Capital, a London-based fund. In July 2011, they introduced the Revere Tactical Risk Fund, an equity investment tool with risk protection. In 2013, they launched REM Founders Fund, a dozen early stage funds, to investors. They also established Revere Merchant Capital, a merchant banking group within the firm.

In August 2026, Revere Capital Advisors filed for Chapter 11 bankruptcy protection, reporting over $20.4 million in liabilities.
