= Project appraisal =

Structured assessment of the viability of a project

Project appraisal is the process of assessing, in a structured way, the case for proceeding with a project or proposal, or the project's viability. It often involves comparing various options, using economic appraisal or some other decision analysis technique.

To ensure success, a project should be objectively appraised during the feasibility study, taken into account principal dimensions, technical, economic, financial, and social implications. To establish the justification for a project the project appraisal is the process of judging whether the project is profitable or not to client.

== Process ==
- Initial assessments
- Define problem and long-list
- Consult and short-list
- Evaluate alternatives
- Compare and select project appraisal.

== Types of appraisal ==
- Technical appraisal
- Project appraisal
- Legal appraisal
- Environment appraisal
- Commercial and marketing appraisal
- Financial/economic appraisal
- Organizational or management appraisal
  - Cost-benefit analysis
- Economic appraisal
  - Cost-effectiveness analysis
  - Scoring and weighting.

== See also ==
- Feasibility study
