= Assessment =

Assessment may refer to:

== Healthcare ==
- Health assessment, identifies needs of the patient and how those needs will be addressed
- Nursing assessment, gathering information about a patient's physiological, psychological, sociological, and spiritual status
- Psychiatric assessment, gathering information about a person in a psychiatric or mental health service
- Psychological assessment, examination of a person's mental health by a professional such as a psychologist

== Other uses ==
- Assessment (journal) (ASMNT), a psychology journal
- Educational assessment, documenting knowledge, skills, aptitudes, and beliefs
- Environmental impact assessment, assessment of environmental consequences of a plan
- Library assessment, to learn about the needs of patrons
- Risk assessment, determining value of risk related to a concrete situation and a recognized threat
- Survey data collection, marketing assessments
- Tax assessment, determining amounts to be paid or assessed for tax or insurance purposes
- Threat assessment, determining risk in criminal psychology and international security contexts
- Vulnerability assessment, identifying, quantifying, and ranking vulnerabilities in a system
- Writing assessment, examining practices, technologies, and process of using writing to assess performance and potential
- WikiProject#WikiProjects and assessments of article importance and quality, on Wikipedia
- The Assessment, a 2024 film

== See also ==
- Exam (disambiguation)
- Examination (disambiguation)
