= Feasibility study =

Assessment of the practicality of a project or system

A feasibility study is an assessment of the practicality of a project or system. A feasibility study aims to objectively and rationally uncover the strengths and weaknesses of an existing business or proposed venture, opportunities and threats present in the natural environment, the resources required to carry through, and ultimately the prospects for success. In its simplest terms, the two criteria to judge feasibility are cost required and value to be attained.

A well-designed feasibility study should provide a historical background of the business or project, a description of the product or service, accounting statements, details of the operations and management, marketing research and policies, financial data, legal requirements and tax obligations. Generally, feasibility studies precede technical development and project implementation. A feasibility study evaluates the project's potential for success; therefore, perceived objectivity is an important factor in the credibility of the study for potential investors and lending institutions. It must therefore be conducted with an objective, unbiased approach to provide information upon which decisions can be based.

== Formal definition ==
A project feasibility study is a comprehensive report that examines in detail the five frames of analysis of a given project. It also takes into consideration its four Ps, its risks and POVs, and its constraints (calendar, costs, and norms of quality). The goal is to determine whether the project should go ahead, be redesigned, or else abandoned altogether.

The five frames of analysis are:

- The frame of definition;
- the frame of contextual risks;
- the frame of potentiality;
- the parametric frame;
- the frame of dominant and contingency strategies.

The four Ps are traditionally defined as Plan, Processes, People, and Power. The risks are considered to be external to the project (e.g., weather conditions) and are divided in eight categories: (Plan) financial and organizational (e.g., government structure for a private project); (Processes) environmental and technological; (People) marketing and sociocultural; and (Power) legal and political. POVs are Points of Vulnerability: they differ from risks in the sense that they are internal to the project and can be controlled or else eliminated.

The constraints are the standard constraints of calendar, costs and norms of quality that can each be objectively determined and measured along the entire project lifecycle. Depending on projects, portions of the study may suffice to produce a feasibility study; smaller projects, for example, may not require an exhaustive environmental assessment.

== Common factors ==
TELOS is an acronym in project management used to define five areas of feasibility that determine whether a project should run or not.

1. T – Technical – Is the project technically possible?
2. E – Economic – Can the project be afforded? Will it increase profit?
3. L – Legal – Is the project legal?
4. O – Operational – How will the current operations support the change?
5. S – Scheduling – Can the project be done in time?

=== Technical feasibility ===
This assessment is based on an outline design of system requirements, to determine whether the company has the technical expertise to handle completion of the project. When writing a feasibility report, the following should be taken to consideration:

- A brief description of the business to assess more possible factors which could affect the study
- The part of the business being examined
- The human and economic factor
- The possible solutions to the problem

At this level, the concern is whether the proposal is both technically and legally feasible (assuming moderate cost).

The technical feasibility assessment is focused on gaining an understanding of the present technical resources of the organization and their applicability to the expected needs of the proposed system. It is an evaluation of the hardware and software and how it meets the need of the proposed system

==== Method of production ====
The selection among a number of methods to produce the same commodity should be undertaken first. Factors that make one method being preferred to other method in agricultural projects are the following:

- Availability of inputs or raw materials and their quality and prices.
- Availability of markets for outputs of each method and the expected prices for these outputs.
- Various efficiency factors such as the expected increase in one additional unit of fertilizer or productivity of a specified crop per one thing

==== Production technique ====
After we determine the appropriate method of production of a commodity, it is necessary to look for the optimal technique to produce this commodity.

==== Project requirements ====
Once the method of production and its technique are determined, technical people have to determine the projects' requirements during the investment and operating periods. These include:

- Determination of tools and equipment needed for the project such as drinkers and feeders or pumps or pipes ...etc.
- Determination of projects' requirements of constructions such as buildings, storage, and roads ...etc. in addition to internal designs for these requirements.
- Determination of projects' requirements of skilled and unskilled labor and managerial and financial labor.
- Determination of construction period concerning the costs of designs and consultations and the costs of constructions and other tools.
- Determination of minimum storage of inputs, cash money to cope with operating and contingency costs.

==== Project location ====
The most important factors that determine the selection of project location are the following:

- Availability of land (proper acreage and reasonable costs).
- The impact of the project on the environment and the approval of the concerned institutions for license.
- The costs of transporting inputs and outputs to the project's location (i.e., the distance from the markets).
- Availability of various services related to the project such as availability of extension services or veterinary or water or electricity or good roads ...etc.

=== Legal feasibility ===
It determines whether the proposed system conflicts with legal requirements, e.g., a data processing system must comply with the local data protection regulations and if the proposed venture is acceptable in accordance to the laws of the land.

=== Operational feasibility study ===
Operational feasibility is the measure of how well a proposed system solves problems and takes advantage of the opportunities identified during scope definition and how it satisfies the requirements identified in the requirements analysis phase of system development.

The operational feasibility assessment focuses on the degree to which the proposed development project fits in with the existing business environment and objectives about the development schedule, delivery date, corporate culture and existing business processes.

To ensure success, desired operational outcomes must be imparted during design and development. These include such design-dependent parameters as reliability, maintainability, supportability, usability, producibility, disposability, sustainability, affordability, etc. These parameters are required to be considered at the early stages of the design if desired operational behaviours are to be realised. A system design and development requires appropriate and timely application of engineering and management efforts to meet the previously mentioned parameters. A system may serve its intended purpose most effectively when its technical and operating characteristics are engineered into the design. Therefore, operational feasibility is a critical aspect of systems engineering that must be integral to the early design phases.

=== Time feasibility ===
A time feasibility study will take into account the period in which the project is going to take up to its completion. A project will fail if it takes too long to be completed before it is useful. Typically this means estimating how long the system will take to develop, and if it can be completed in a given time period using some methods like payback period. Time feasibility is a measure of how reasonable the project timetable is. Given our technical expertise, are the project deadlines reasonable? Some projects are initiated with specific deadlines. It is necessary to determine whether the deadlines are mandatory or desirable.

== Other feasibility factors ==
=== Resource feasibility ===
Describe how much time is available to build the new system, when it can be built, whether it interferes with normal business operations, type and amount of resources required, dependencies, and developmental procedures with company revenue prospectus.

=== Financial feasibility ===
In case of a new project, financial viability can be judged on the following parameters:

- Total estimated cost of the project
- Financing of the project in terms of its capital structure, debt to equity ratio and promoter's share of total cost
- Existing investment by the promoter in any other business
- Projected cash flow and profitability

The financial viability of a project should provide the following information:

- Full details of the assets to be financed and how liquid those assets are.
- Rate of conversion to cash-liquidity (i.e., how easily the various assets can be converted to cash).
- Project's funding potential and repayment terms.
- Sensitivity in the repayments capability to the following factors:
  - Mild slowing of sales.
  - Acute reduction/slowing of sales.
  - Small increase in cost.
  - Large increase in cost.
  - Adverse economic conditions.

In 1983 the first generation of the Computer Model for Feasibility Analysis and Reporting (COMFAR), a computation tool for financial analysis of investments, was released. Since then, this United Nations Industrial Development Organization (UNIDO) software has been developed to also support the economic appraisal of projects. The COMFAR III Expert is intended as an aid in the analysis of investment projects. The main module of the program accepts financial and economic data, produces financial and economic statements and graphical displays and calculates measures of performance. Supplementary modules assist in the analytical process. Cost-benefit and value-added methods of economic analysis developed by UNIDO are included in the program and the methods of major international development institutions are accommodated. The program is applicable for the analysis of investment in new projects and expansion or rehabilitation of existing enterprises as, e.g., in the case of reprivatisation projects. For joint ventures, the financial perspective of each partner or class of shareholder can be developed. Analysis can be performed under a variety of assumptions concerning inflation, currency revaluation and price escalations.

To enhance the reliability of financial projections, contemporary feasibility reports often incorporate multi-scenario modeling. This involves evaluating a project's potential return on investment (ROI) under optimistic, pessimistic, and neutral conditions, allowing for a more resilient risk assessment. Furthermore, the effectiveness of these studies is frequently tied to the SMART criteria, ensuring that project objectives remain specific, measurable, achievable, relevant, and time-bound. By stress-testing the venture against these benchmarks, the study moves beyond static data to provide a dynamic preview of the project's real-world endurance and operational viability.

== Market research ==
Market research studies is one of the most important sections of the feasibility study as it examines the marketability of the product or service and convinces readers that there is a potential market for the product or service. If a significant market for the product or services cannot be established, then there is no project. Typically, market studies will assess the potential sales of the product, absorption and market capture rates and the project's timing. The feasibility study outputs the feasibility study report, a report detailing the evaluation criteria, the study findings, and the recommendations.

== See also ==
- Project appraisal
- Environmental impact
- Mining feasibility study
- Proof of concept
- SWOT analysis
