= Evaluation (journal) =

- Discipline: Evaluation
- Language: English
- Edited by: Elliot Stern

Publication details
- History: 1995-present
- Publisher: SAGE Publications
- Frequency: Quarterly

Standard abbreviations
- ISO 4: Evaluation

Indexing
- ISSN: 1356-3890
- LCCN: 95044689
- OCLC no.: 231678104

Links
- Journal homepage; Online access; Online archive

Evaluation is a quarterly peer-reviewed academic journal that covers in the field of evaluation. The editor-in-chief is Eliot Stern (Tavistock Institute). It was established in 1995 and is currently published by SAGE Publications in association with the Tavistock Institute.

== Abstracting and indexing ==
Evaluation is abstracted and indexed in:

- Academic Search Premier
- British Education Index
- Current Contents/Social and Behavioral Sciences
- Educational Research Abstracts Online
- Human Resources Abstracts
- SciVal
- Scopus
