= Carol Weiss =

American policy analyst and education scholar

- Born: 1927; New York
- Died: January 8, 2013 (age 86)
- Education: Cornell University; Columbia University
- Scientific career
- Fields: Education sciences; Policy analysis
- Workplaces: Bureau of Applied Social Research; Harvard Graduate School of Education

Carol Hirschon Weiss was an American scholar of education and policy analysis. She was the Beatrice B. Whiting Professor of Education at the Harvard Graduate School of Education. She was one of the founders of the scientific study of social programs and policies.

== Education and positions ==
Weiss was born in New York. She obtained a Bachelor's Degree at Cornell University, followed by an M.A. and a Ph.D. at Columbia University. Weiss graduated from Columbia in 1977, where she worked at the Bureau of Applied Social Research. In 1978 she became a faculty member at the Graduate School of Education at Harvard. She was named the Beatrice B. Whiting Professor of Education there in 1999. Weiss was also a visiting fellow at the Center for Advanced Study in the Behavioral Sciences, the Brookings Institution, and the United States Department of Education. She also served as President of the Policy Studies Organization.

== Research ==
Weiss's research focused on policy studies, particularly in education, and she was one of the earliest scholars to develop methods for scientifically evaluating social programs. Weiss was one of the founders of theory-based evaluation, an approach for organizations to effect social change. In addition to developing methodologies for the scientific evaluation of policies, Weiss was also particularly noted for training others in how to apply those methodologies, and developing a community of people trained in the scientific evaluation of policies.

Weiss published 11 books, in addition to more than 100 journal articles. Kathleen McCartney, while Dean of the Harvard Graduate School of Education, described two of Weiss's books as being especially seminal: Weiss's 1972 book Evaluation research: Methods of assessing program effectiveness, and her 1998 book Evaluation: Methods for Studying Programs and Policies. Evaluation research in particular has been described as a fundamental work in program evaluation. The political scientist Kathryn Newcomer, in a commentary on Evaluation research, summarized the book as "an in-depth analysis of many of the crucial and complex issues that plague evaluators and public managers", which argues that program evaluators and program managers should take into account the political and social context of public policies.

In addition to her academic research, Weiss actively consulted on a wide variety of policy programs with governments and organizations throughout her career. She retired in 2006, after which she became a docent at the Boston Museum of Science. She died in 2013.

== Selected works ==
- Evaluation Research: Methods of Assessing Program Effectiveness (1972)
- Using social research in public policy making (1977)
- "Theory-Based Evaluation: Past, Present, and Future"
- "The many meanings of research utilization", Public administration review (1979)
- Evaluation: Methods for Studying Programs and Policies (1998)
- "Have We Learned Anything New About the Use of Evaluation?", American Journal of Evaluation (1998)

== Selected awards ==
- Myrdal Award, Evaluation Research Society
