= Pawson Peak =

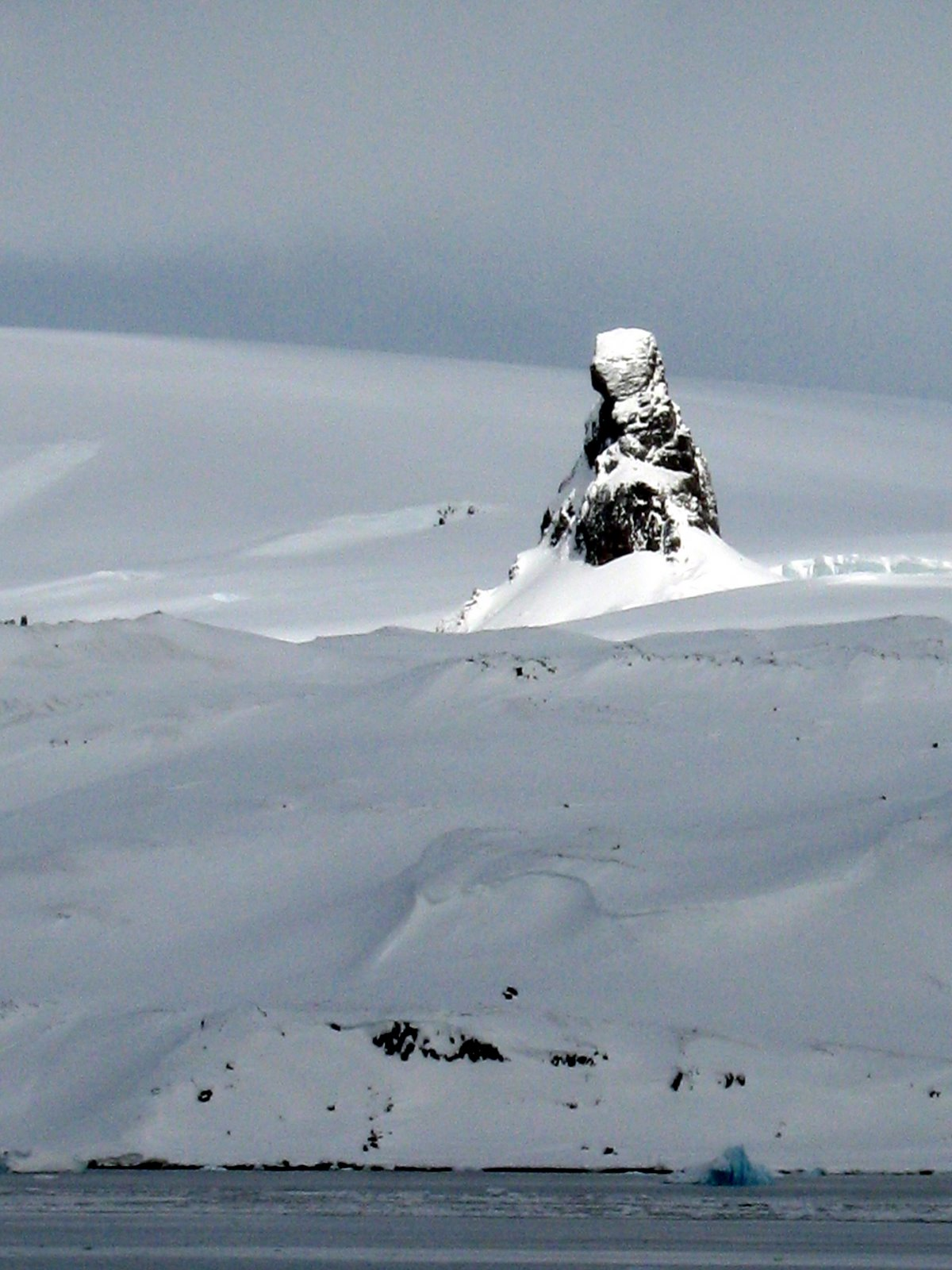
Czajkowski Needle (King George Island)

Pawson Peak (62°11′S 58°28′W) is a solitary peak of irregular conical shape, rising to 250 m west-northwest of Sphinx Hill, Admiralty Bay, King George Island. Named in 1977 by the United Kingdom Antarctic Place-Names Committee (UK-APC) after Kenneth Pawson, Falkland Islands Dependencies Survey (FIDS) meteorological observer, Port Lockroy, 1947–48; general assistant, Admiralty Bay, 1948–50. The name "Czajkowski Needle" was applied to this feature by the Polish Antarctic Expedition, 1977–78, after Ryszard Czajkowski, a geophysicist with the expedition who climbed the peak.
