= Assessment (journal) =

- Discipline: Psychology
- Language: English
- Edited by: Leonard J. Simms

Publication details
- History: 1994-present
- Publisher: SAGE Publications
- Frequency: 8/year
- Impact factor: 3.0 (2025)

Standard abbreviations
- ISO 4: Assessment

Indexing
- ISSN: 1073-1911 (print); 1552-3489 (web)
- LCCN: 98641871
- OCLC no.: 750971065

Links
- Journal homepage; Online access; Online archive

Assessment (ASMNT) is a peer-reviewed academic journal that covers research in the field of psychology, especially applied clinical assessment. The editor is Leonard J. Simms (University at Buffalo). It was established in 1994 and is currently published by SAGE Publications. This journal is a member of the Committee on Publication Ethics (COPE).

== Abstracting and indexing ==
ASMNT is abstracted and indexed in Scopus, in PsycINFO, and in the Social Sciences Citation Index among others. According to the Journal Citation Reports, its 2017 impact factor is 3.197, ranking it 26 out of 127 journals in the category "Psychology, Clinical".
