= Evaluation map =

In mathematics, evaluation map may refer to:

- The map that associates the pair of a function and an argument with the corresponding value of the function. In particular:
  - Function evaluation
  - Polynomial evaluation (see also Polynomial ring § Polynomial evaluation)
  - The function apply in Apply § Universal property
- Evaluation map (topology)
