= Exam (disambiguation) =

An exam is an informal term for an examination or test.

Exam may also refer to:

- Exam (2003 film), a Romanian film
- Exam (2009 film), a British film
- The Exam (2006 film), a Turkish comedy-drama film
- The Exam (2011 film), a Hungarian drama film
- Exam (TV series), a 2026 Indian Tamil-language streaming television series

== See also ==
- Assessment (disambiguation)
- Examination (disambiguation)
