= Carol Taylor Fitz-Gibbon =

British educational researcher and analyst

- Born: 1938; Manchester
- Died: 2017 (aged 78–79)
- Education: University of London; University of California, Los Angeles
- Scientific career
- Workplaces: University of Manchester; Newcastle University; Durham University

Carol Taylor Fitz-Gibbon (1938–2017) was a British educational researcher and analyst. Fitz-Gibbon wrote several books on evaluation, educational data and quantifying attainment. She served as the Director of the Centre for Evaluation & Monitoring from 1989 to 2003.

== Early life and education ==
Fitz-Gibbon was born Carol Taylor in Manchester in 1938. She was awarded a state scholarship which allowed her to study physics and geography at the University of London. After graduating Fitz-Gibbon trained as a teacher, and began teaching physics in East London. In 1962 Fitz-Gibbon moved to the United States, where she continued teaching until 1970. She started working toward a master's degree in education research. She was awarded a grant from the United States Department of Education to study gifted children. This eventually inspired the topic of her PhD study, on peer tutoring in inner-city schools. She earned her doctoral degree at the University of California, Los Angeles in 1975. She identified the power of cross-age tutoring as an effective intervention and continued to promote it throughout her life.

== Research and career ==
Together with Lynn Lyons Morris, Fitz-Gibbon offered the first definition of theory-based evaluation as "one in which the selection of program features to evaluate is determined by an explicit conceptualization of the program in terms of a theory […] which attempts to explain how the program produces the desired effects."

Fitz-Gibbon returned to the United Kingdom in 1976, where she was appointed a lecturer at the University of Manchester Institute of Science and Technology. She became interested in evidence-based medicine, and how similar approaches could be used in education policy and evaluation. She moved to Newcastle University in 1977, and was promoted to Professor in 1991. Fitz-Gibbon invented the concept that came to be known as value added. In 1983 she launched the A-Level Information System (Alis) an adapted assessment that supports students as they work for their GCE Advanced Level exams. She developed two additional information systems (MidYIS and Yellis), which supported teachers in collecting and analysing student data. Fitz-Gibbon would not allow schools or policy makers to use Alis to compare the performance of schools. From 1989 to 2003 Fitz-Gibbon served as Director of the Curriculum, Evaluation and Management Centre (now Centre for Evaluation & Monitoring). The CEM was originally located at Newcastle University, and moved with Fitz-Gibbon when she moved to Durham. Fitz-Gibbon was appointed Professor of Education at Durham University in 1996.

At Durham Fitz-Gibbon became somewhat of an activist in education evaluation. She was increasingly critical of the way that Ofsted evaluated schools, and established the Office for Standards in Inspection (OFSTIN) to "inspect the inspectors". She did not think that the inspection methodology proposed by Ofsted met appropriate research standards, and that sufficient validation of Ofsted's approach had not been provided. In 1999 she presented evidence to the Parliamentary Select Committee, calling Ofsted a "flawed system". She led the Centre for Evaluation & Monitoring (CEM) until her retirement in 2003.

=== Selected publications ===
Her publications include:

- Fitz-Gibbon, Carol Taylor (1978). How to design a program evaluation. Sage Publications. ISBN 9780803910683.
- Fitz-Gibbon, Carol Taylor (1987). How to Measure Attitudes. Sage Publications. ISBN 9780803931312.
- Fitz-Gibbon, Carol Taylor (1987). How to Analyze Data. Sage Publications. ISBN 9780803931336.
- Fitz-Gibbon, Carol Taylor (1996). Monitoring Education. Continuum. ISBN 9781441168436.

== Personal life ==
Fitz-Gibbon had two children with educator William Fitz-Gibbon, followed by seven grand children. After retiring in 2003 she returned to Los Angeles, California. She was diagnosed with Parkinson's disease in 2005. She spent her much of her life after the diagnosis campaigning locally and online to raise awareness of the link between pesticides and Parkinson's, in an effort to save others from a similar fate. Her daughter, Sorel Fitz-Gibbon, is a researcher in bioinformatics and comparative genomics at University of California, Los Angeles.
