= Communities Without Boundaries International =

International non-governmental organization

Communities Without Boundaries International (CWBI) is a non-governmental organization based in Zambia that does work on peace-building and sustainable development projects. It was founded in 1999 and has inspiration from the nonviolence principles promoted by Martin Luther King Jr. and Mohandas K. Gandhi.

In 2013, CWBI joined an alliance of organizations advocating for issues such as labor, civil rights, human rights, education, media, and housing. This coalition organized the 50th anniversary commemoration of the 1963 March on Washington.
