= Guy Pawson =

Albert Pawson
Personal information
- Full name: Albert Guy Pawson
- Born: 30 May 1888; Bramley, West Yorkshire
- Died: 25 February 1986 (aged 97); Lamerton, Devon
- Batting: Right-handed
- Role: Batsman/wicket-keeper

Domestic team information
- Years: Team
- 1908–1911: Oxford University
- 1908: Worcestershire
- FC debut: 28 May 1908 Oxford University v Gentlemen of England
- Last FC: 5 July 1911 Oxford University v Cambridge University

Career statistics
Competition	First-class
Matches	28
Runs scored	448
Batting average	12.10
100s/50s	0/0
Top score	44*
Catches/stumpings	30/16
- Source: CricInfo, 12 September 2007

Albert Guy Pawson CMG (30 May 1888 – 25 February 1986) was a British colonial administrator who incidentally happened to play a few first-class cricket games while at university.

He was educated at Winchester College and Christ Church, Oxford, and most of his matches were for the Oxford University cricket side, but he did make one appearance in county cricket, playing for Worcestershire against Oxford in 1908. He also had one game for a combined Oxford and Cambridge Universities team.

He made his first-class debut for Oxford against the Gentlemen of England at The University Parks in May 1908. Pawson played a number of times for Oxford during the following three seasons. His final appearance was in the Varsity Match against Cambridge at Lord's in July 1911.

Two of his relatives played first-class cricket: his son Tony played 69 first-class matches, being capped by Kent in 1946 as well as appearing for Oxford and the Gentlemen, while his brother Arthur played a handful of games for Oxford in 1903.

Pawson joined the Sudan Civil Service in 1911 and was Governor of White Nile Province between 1927 and 1931 and of Upper Nile Province from 1931 until 1934. He was Secretary of the International Rubber Regulation Committee between 1934 and 1942, worked at the Colonial Office from 1942 to 1944, then was Secretary of the International Rubber Study Group from 1944 to 1948 and its Secretary-General 1948–60. He was awarded the 4th class of the Order of the Nile in 1924 and appointed CMG in the 1935 New Year Honours.
