= Ray Pawson =

Ray Pawson is emeritus Professor of Social Research Methodology in the School of Sociology and Social Policy at the University of Leeds. His main interest lies in research methodology. He has written widely on the philosophy and practice of research, covering methods qualitative and quantitative, pure and applied, contemporaneous and historical. There is a common 'realist' thread underlying every word, albeit a modest, middle-range, empirically rich mode of realism.

== Key Publications ==
- Pawson, R. (1989) "A Measure for Measures: A Manifesto for Empirical Sociology", Routledge.
- Pawson, R.; Tilley, N (1997) "Realistic Evaluation", Sage.
- Pawson, R. (2006) "Evidence Based Policy: A Realist Perspective", Sage.
- Pawson, R. (2006) "Simple Principles for The Evaluation of Complex Programmes," In: Killoran, A et al. Evidence Based Public Health, Oxford University Press.
- Pawson R (2013) "The Science of Evaluation: A Realist Manifesto". London, Sage.
- Pawson R (2024) "How to Think like a Realist." Cheltenham, Edward Elgar.
- Pawson R (2026) ;Farewell to Evaluation: From Accreditation to Explanation', in Sridharan S and Leeuw F: "From Silos to Ecologies: Towards an Ecology of Evidence to Navigate Solutions." London, Routledge.
