= Tony Pawson (cricketer) =

English sportsman (1921–2012)

Tony Pawson OBE
- Pawson in 1948

Personal information
- Full name: Henry Anthony Pawson
- Born: 22 August 1921; Chertsey, Surrey
- Died: 12 October 2012 (aged 91); Chilcomb, Hampshire
- Batting: Right-handed
- Bowling: Right-arm off-spin
- Relatives: Guy Pawson (father); Arthur Pawson (uncle)

Domestic team information
- Years: Team
- 1946–1953: Kent
- 1947–1948: Oxford University

Career statistics
| Competition | First-class |
|---|---|
| Matches | 69 |
| Runs scored | 3,807 |
| Batting average | 37.32 |
| 100s/50s | 7/23 |
| Top score | 150 |
| Balls bowled | 555 |
| Wickets | 7 |
| Bowling average | 40.00 |
| 5 wickets in innings | 0 |
| 10 wickets in match | 0 |
| Best bowling | 2/26 |
| Catches/stumpings | 36/– |
- Source: Cricinfo, 4 December 2014

Henry Anthony Pawson OBE (22 August 1921 – 12 October 2012) was an English sportsman who played cricket and association football and was a leading fly fisherman. He worked as a cricket writer and journalist. He was the son of Guy Pawson, and father of scientist Anthony Pawson.

== Biography ==
Pawson was born at Chertsey in Surrey and educated at Winchester College and Christ Church, Oxford. During the Second World War he served in the Rifle Brigade, reaching the rank of Major and seeing active service in Italy and Tunisia, being mentioned in despatches. He worked for Reed International where he became Personnel Director, and then as an industrial relations adviser.

Pawson played a total of 69 first-class cricket matches for Oxford University and Kent County Cricket Club. He batted right-handed, scoring 3,807 runs (including seven centuries) at an average of 37.32. He captained Oxford in 1948 when they defeated Cambridge University by an innings.

Pawson was a good all-round sportsman and also played association football to a high level. He won a Blue for Oxford University and played two league matches for Charlton Athletic, scoring on his debut versus Tottenham Hotspur in December 1951. He was a member of the Pegasus A.F.C. team that won the FA Amateur Cup in 1951 and a member of the Great Britain football squad for the 1952 Summer Olympic Games although he did not feature in any of the team's matches. He played as a winger.

He became cricket correspondent of The Observer and chaired the Cricket Writers' Club, 1980–81.

He was regarded as one of the world's leading fly fishermen and was individual World Fly Fishing Champion in 1984. He also won world titles as part of the England national team. In the 1988 Birthday Honours, he was appointed Officer of the Order of the British Empire (OBE) for "services to angling". He died on 12 October 2012, aged 91.

== Select bibliography ==
- The Football Managers 1973
- The Goalscorers: From Bloomer to Keegan 1978
- Runs and Catches 1980
- Gareth Edwards on Fishing 1984 (with Gareth Edwards)
- Flyfishing Around the World: The International Guide for the Gamefisher 1987
- Two Game Fishermen: An Hereditary Passion 1993 (with John Pawson)
- Kingswood Book of Fishing 1992 (with John Pawson)
