= Peter H. Rossi =

American sociologist (1921–2006)

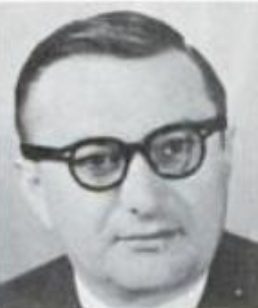
- Peter H. Rossi, from a 1963 publication of the United States federal government
- Born: December 27, 1921; Corona, Queens, New York
- Died: October 7, 2006 (aged 84); Amherst, Massachusetts
- Education: Columbia University
- Spouse: Alice Schaerr
- Scientific career
- Fields: Sociology
- Workplaces: Harvard University; University of Chicago; Johns Hopkins University; University of Massachusetts
- Thesis: Latent structure analysis and research on social stratification (1951)
- Doctoral students: James A. Davis

Peter Henry Rossi (December 27, 1921 – October 7, 2006) was a prominent sociologist best known for his research on the origin of homelessness, and documenting the changing face of American homelessness in the 1980s. Rossi was also known for his work devising ways to evaluate federally funded initiatives in education, health services, crime control, and housing. He influentially applied his sociological expertise to affect related policy-making and funding agencies. At his death, he was the Stuart A. Rice professor emeritus of Sociology and the director emeritus of the Social and Demographic Research Institute (SADRI) at the University of Massachusetts Amherst.

== Biography ==
Rossi was born December 27, 1921, in Corona, Queens, New York City, New York, to Italian immigrant parents. He graduated from the City College of New York with a degree in sociology in 1943. After graduating, he intended on going into social work; however, he enlisted in the Army in 1943, and served in the 100th Infantry Division in Europe during World War II.

After the war, Rossi used the G.I. Bill to continue his education at Columbia University. While at Columbia, Rossi met his wife, Alice Schaerr. Alice also became an eminent sociologist and in 1966, was one of the founders of the National Organization for Women (NOW). During his time at Columbia, Rossi was influenced and mentored by two professors and notable social researchers, Robert K. Merton and Paul F. Lazarsfeld. Rossi's doctoral dissertation was entitled "The Application of Latent Structure Analysis to the Study of Social Stratification" and he earned his doctorate in sociology in 1951.

After earning his doctorate, Rossi went into academia joining the faculty at Harvard University for a four-year stint as a research associate and assistant professor. In 1955 he joined the University of Chicago's Department of Sociology faculty, where he stayed for 12 years, first as an assistant professor then full professor. He also was director of the National Opinion Research Center in Hyde Park for seven years, helping to secure the funds to construct a new building.

While at the University of Chicago, Rossi served on the doctoral committee for Chicago priest and writer Andrew Greeley. The two collaborated on a 1962 study of the Catholic school system which was published as "The Education of Catholic Americans", and was notable as the first systematic study of Catholic schools. Rossi was the editor of the American Journal of Sociology from 1958 to 1961, and also served as editor of the Social Science Research journal, where he was senior advisory editor at the time of his death.

Due to disagreements, with then University of Chicago President Edward Levi, over issues including funding of the research center, Rossi left the University of Chicago. After leaving Chicago, Rossi assumed the chair of the Department of Social Relations at Johns Hopkins University, where he also served as Director of Research of the Social and Demographic Research Institute at the University of Massachusetts.

While at Johns Hopkins University, Rossi was involved in several important War on Poverty era program evaluations. One such evaluation was assisting the President's Commission on Civil Disorders with understanding the causes of the urban unrest following the 1967 race riots. Out of his work with the President's Commission on Civil Disorders grew a comprehensive study of how cities in America responded to the riots of the late 1960s in his work "Roots of Urban Discontent: Public Policy, Municipal Institutions and the Ghetto".

In 1974, Rossi joined the sociology faculty at the University of Massachusetts, where he stayed until his retirement in the early 1990s. While at the University of Massachusetts, Rossi served as the 71st president of the American Sociological Association from 1979 to 1980.

During his career, Rossi authored over 40 books and 200 scholarly journal articles. He was highly regarded, widely recognized, and sought after for his work on evaluating social programs. Included in this work are his controversial studies of the homeless problem in America. The work for which he is best known is “Down and Out in America: The Origins of Homelessness” (University of Chicago, 1989). In this research, he chronicled the shift in the nation's homeless population from the older white male denizens of post-World War II skid rows to a younger, larger group that included many more women, children and minorities. In conducting this research he made the first systematic attempts to count the homeless, ultimately finding dramatically smaller numbers than claimed by advocates for the homeless. He found that homelessness is largely a temporary rather than permanent problem and, therefore, that short infusions of aid could make a large difference.

His work focused on federal food programs was documented in his book Feeding the Poor: Assessing Federal Food Programs. His work on assessing the severity of crimes via surveys of the American public (Public Opinion on Sentencing Federal Criminals and Just Punishments: Sentencing Guidelines and Public Opinion Compared) has influenced the U.S. Sentencing Commission. His efforts on evaluating public welfare and anti-crime programs was highly influential and was frequently cited by Senator Daniel Patrick Moynihan and other policy makers.

Rossi died October 7, 2006, in Amherst, Massachusetts.

== Five-Domain Evaluation Model ==
In the late 1970s, Peter Rossi with the help of his colleagues Mark W. Lipsey & Howard E Freeman developed an evaluation model called the Five-Domain Evaluation Model. In this model, each evaluation should be custom-made to fit resources, local needs, and the type of program. This includes custom-fitting the evaluation questions, methods and procedures, and the nature of the evaluator-stakeholder relationship. In the eyes of Rossi, the evaluation questions were the core while the rest of the evaluation evolves around it.

The Five-Domain Evaluation Model highlights five primary evaluation domains:

1. Needs assessment of the program
2. Design of the program
3. Program implementation and service delivery assessment
4. Program impact or outcomes assessment
5. Program efficiency assessment

== Metallic Laws of Evaluation ==
Rossi coined the “Metallic Laws of Evaluation” in 1987 to humorously summarize the sobering outcomes of social program research. Rossi’s four laws are:

1. The Iron Law: Expected net impact of large-scale social programs is zero.
2. The Stainless Steel Law: Better designed evaluations are more likely to show zero net impact.
3. The Brass Law: Programs designed to change individuals often result in zero net impact.
4. The Zinc Law: Only programs likely to fail are evaluated.
