= Economic appraisal =

Economic appraisal is a type of decision method applied to a project, programme or policy that takes into account a wide range of costs and benefits, denominated in monetary terms or for which a monetary equivalent can be estimated. Economic appraisal is a key tool for achieving value for money and satisfying requirements for decision accountability. It is a systematic process for examining alternative uses of resources, focusing on assessment of needs, objectives, options, costs, benefits, risks, funding, affordability and other factors relevant to decisions.

The main types of economic appraisal are:

- Cost–benefit analysis
- Cost-effectiveness analysis
- Scoring and weighting

Economic appraisal is a methodology designed to assist in defining problems and finding solutions that offer the best value for money (VFM). This is especially important in relation to public expenditure and is often used as a vehicle for planning and approval of public investment relating to policies, programmes and projects.

The principles of appraisal are applicable to all decisions, even those concerned with small expenditures. However, the scope of appraisal can also be very wide. Good economic appraisal leads to better decisions and VFM. It facilitates good project management and project evaluation. Appraisal is an essential part of good financial management, and it is vital to decision-making and accountability.
