= Accreditation =

Formal recognition of competence

Accreditation is the independent, third-party evaluation of a conformity assessment body (such as certification body, inspection body or laboratory) against recognised standards, conveying formal demonstration of its impartiality and competence to carry out specific conformity assessment tasks (such as certification, inspection and testing).

Accreditation bodies are established in many economies with the primary purpose of ensuring that conformity assessment bodies are subject to oversight by an authoritative body. Accreditation bodies that have been peer-evaluated as competent sign regional and international arrangements to demonstrate their competence. These accreditation bodies then assess and accredit conformity assessment bodies to the relevant standards.

An authoritative body that performs accreditation is called an 'accreditation body'. Global Accreditation Cooperation Incorporated (Global ACI) and the International Forum for Accreditation (IFA) provide international recognitions to accreditation bodies. Global ACI was formed on 1 January 2026 through the merger of the former International Accreditation Forum (IAF) and the International Laboratory Accreditation Cooperation (ILAC) into a single, unified global body. There are many internationally recognized accreditation bodies approved through the multilateral recognition arrangements maintained by Global ACI and IFA.

The Emirates International Accreditation Centre (EIAC) is the largest accreditation body in the Middle East, whereas in South Asia the Pakistan National Accreditation Council (PNAC) and National Accreditation Board for Testing and Calibration Laboratories (NABL), Quality Council of India (QCI) are the largest. In East Asia, the China National Accreditation Board is the largest, while the United Kingdom Accreditation Service (UKAS) is the largest in Europe. The National Association of Testing Authorities (NATA) and the Joint Accreditation System of Australia and New Zealand (JAS-ANZ) being the largest in the Oceania region, with the South African National Accreditation System being the largest in Africa.

For most of the accreditation schemes, international standards issued by the International Organization for Standardization (ISO) are used.

Accreditation can evaluate the learning and job outcomes or result in a sheepskin effect. In some cases accreditation can create a cartel.

== Fields involved ==
Accreditation processes are used in a wide variety of fields:

- Accredited investor
- Accredited in Public Relations
- Accredited registrar
- Construction
- Diplomatic accreditation
- Educational accreditation
  - Higher education accreditation
    - ACGME (USA)
    - List of recognized higher education accreditation organizations
    - List of unrecognized higher education accreditation organizations
      - Accreditation mill
      - List of unaccredited institutions of higher learning
  - Pre-tertiary education accreditation
- Email sender accreditation
- Food safety
  - Global Food Safety Initiative
- Health & Safety Compliance (UK)
- Healthcare
  - American Association for Accreditation of Ambulatory Surgery Facilities
  - Accreditation Commission for Health Care
  - Electronic Healthcare Network Accreditation Commission
  - Emirates International Accreditation Centre (EIAC)
  - International healthcare accreditation
  - Commission on Accreditation of Rehabilitation Facilities
  - Hospital accreditation
  - Joint Commission (USA)
  - United Kingdom Accreditation Forum
- Information assurance
- Personal trainer accreditation
- Professional certification
- Systems engineering
- Translating and interpreting
  - National Accreditation Authority for Translators and Interpreters (Australia)
- Sustainability
  - Sustainable Forest management such as the Forest Stewardship Council (FSC)
  - Sustainable fishing such as the Marine Stewardship Council (MSC)
  - Sustainable aquaculture such as the Aquaculture Stewardship Council (ASC)
  - Sustainable tourism such as the Global Sustainable Tourism Council (GSTC)

== Accreditation standards ==
Many accreditation bodies, such as the UKAS, EIAC, EGAC, PNAC, IAS, NABCB operate according to processes developed by the ISO as specified in ISO/IEC 17011. Accredited entities in specific sectors must provide evidence to the accreditation body that they conform to other standards in the same series:

- ISO 9001: "Quality management systems — Requirements" (2015)
- ISO/IEC 17020: "General criteria for the operation of various types of bodies performing inspection" (2012)
- ISO/IEC 17021-1: "Conformity assessment. Requirements for bodies providing audit and certification of management systems" (2015)
- ISO/IEC 17024: "Conformity Assessment. General requirements for bodies operating certification of persons" (2012)
- ISO/IEC 17025: "General requirements for the competence of testing and calibration laboratories" (2017)

== See also ==
- Authentication
- Certification
- Certification and accreditation
- Homologation
- Quality assurance
- Standards organization
- Verification and validation

International agencies

- International Accreditation Forum (IAF)
- International Certification Accreditation Council (ICAC)
- International Council on Educational Credential Evaluation (ICECE)
- International Laboratory Accreditation Cooperation (ILAC)

National agencies

- Department of Defence Information Assurance Certification and Accreditation Process
- Deutsches Institut für Bautechnik
