= Equestrian helmet =

Safety equipment for horse riding

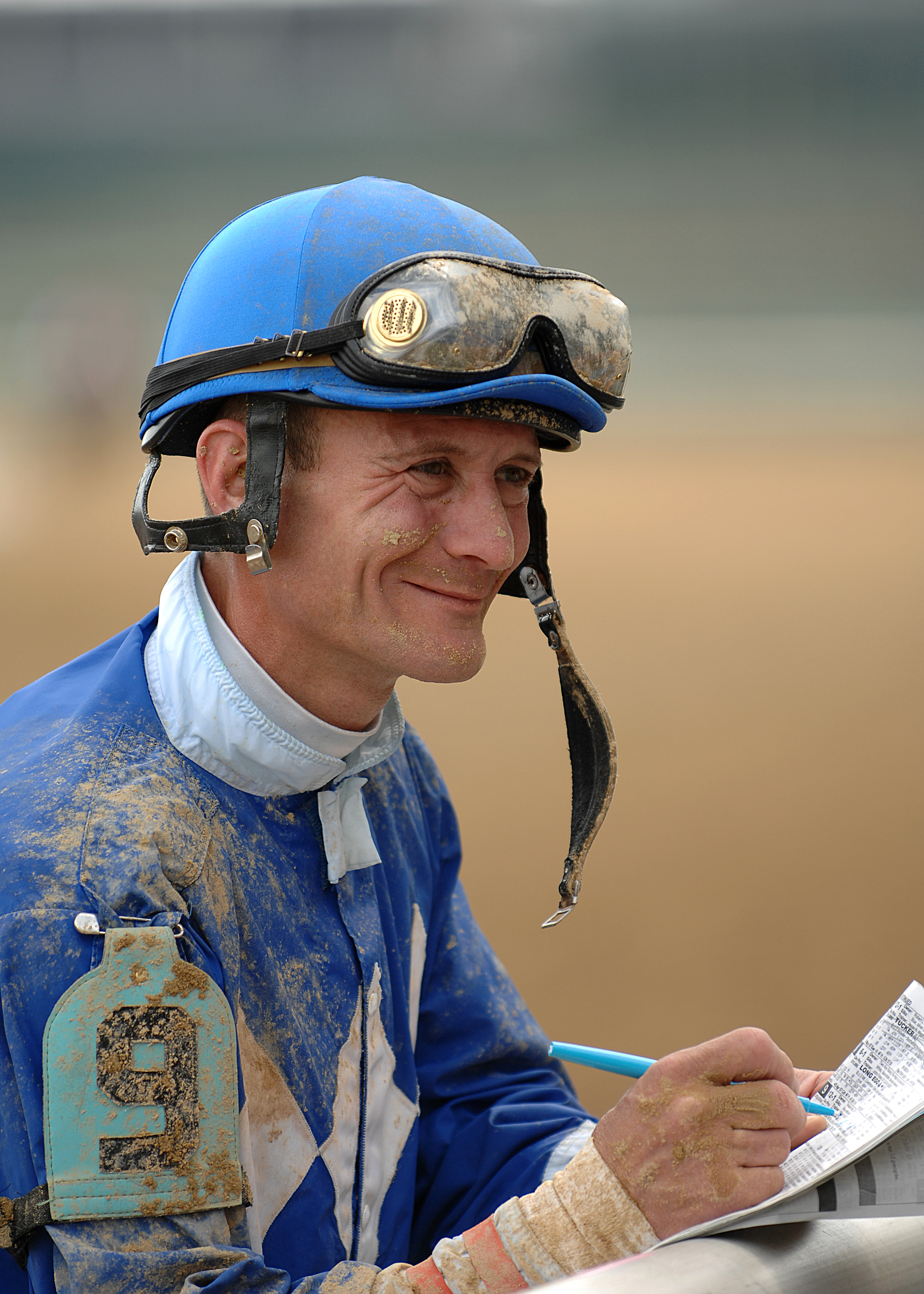
Jockey Calvin Borel wears a riding helmet

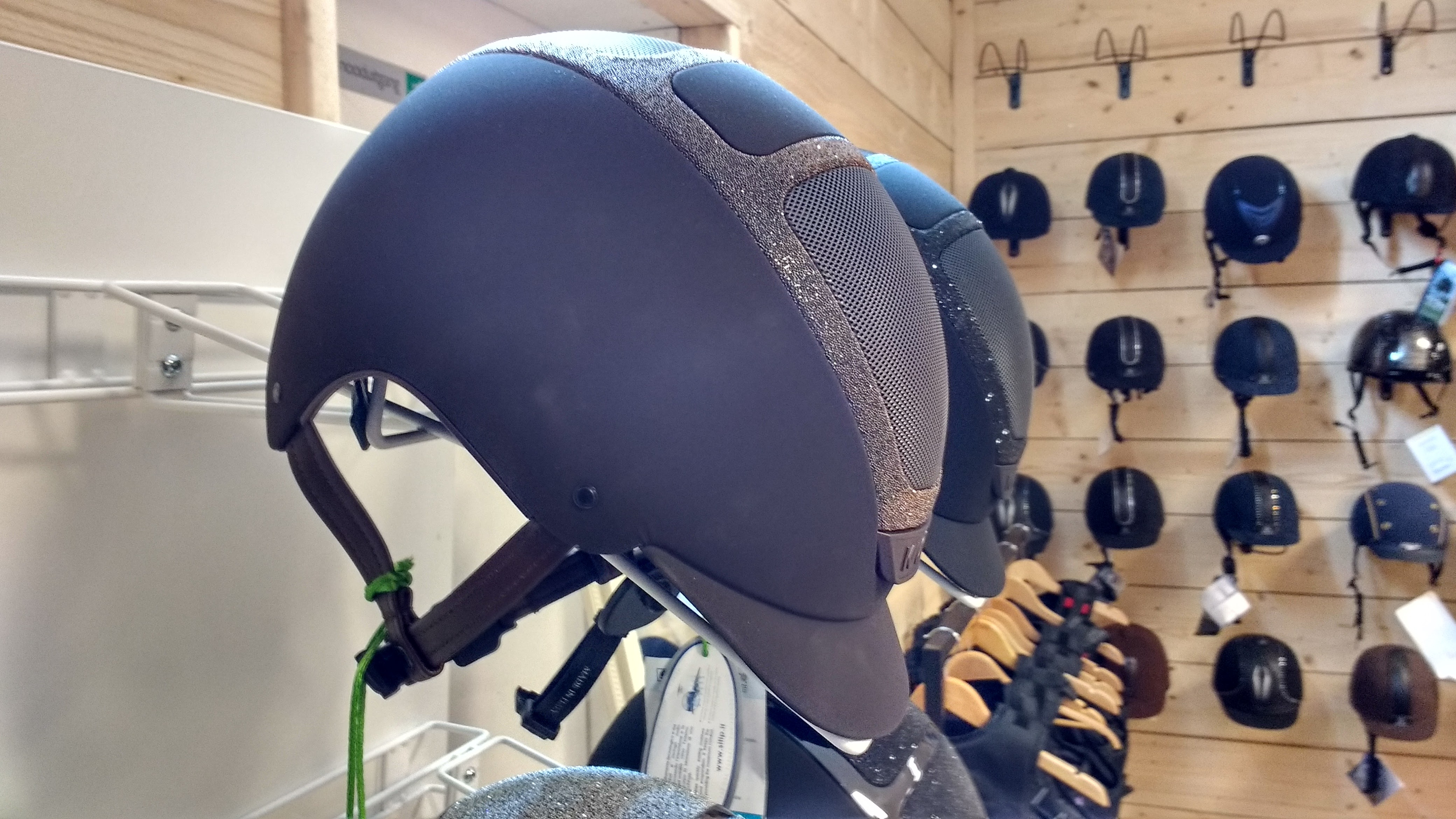
A selection of equestrian helmets

An equestrian helmet is a form of protective headgear worn when riding horses. This type of helmet is specially designed to protect the rider's head in the event of falls from a horse, especially from striking a hard object while falling or being accidentally struck in the head by a horse's hoof.

Certified helmets are required headgear for many competitive riding events, particularly where horse and rider must jump or work at high speed. Helmets are worn more often by English-style riders and are gaining acceptance as required headgear for children and young teens. They are also widely accepted in fields such as horse racing, eventing or show jumping. They are required in eventing, in endurance riding and other types of competitions. People who take their horses hacking or trail riding sometimes wear helmets, though there are tremendous variations in helmet use in different regions and cultures. In the United States, use is by fewer than one in eight riders. Some states, such as Florida and New York, are starting to require by law that riders under the age of 14 wear helmets at equestrian establishments, on public highways and publicly owned land.

== Design ==
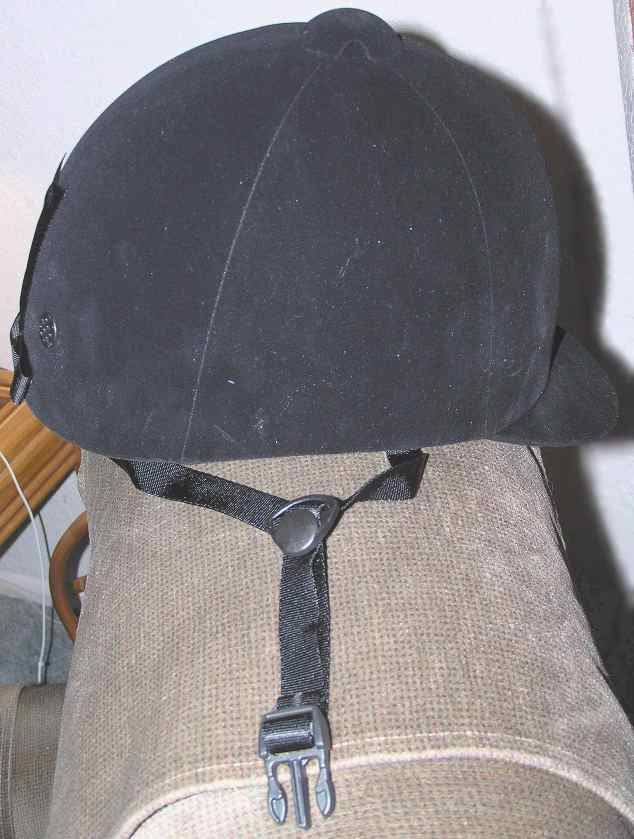
A modern ASTM/SEI show-legal helmet covered in velveteen to resemble the old style hunt cap, but has visibly more protective material and an attached harness

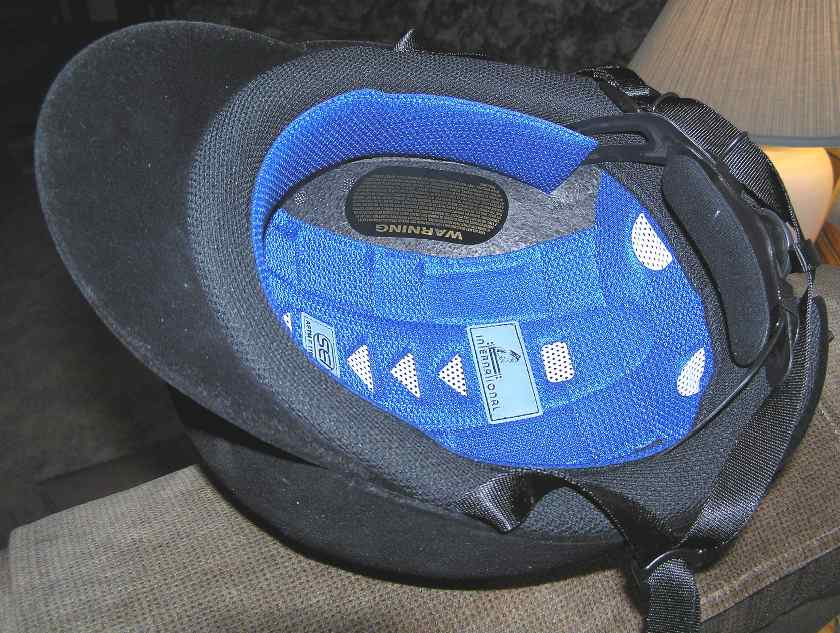
The inside of an ASTM/SEI-approved helmet, showing padding, ventilation system, adjustment mechanisms, and part of the harness.

An equestrian helmet has a hard shell on the outside of an impact-resistant resin or plastic, sometimes covered with cloth for a more attractive look. The brim is particularly flexible and will give way immediately in the event a rider lands on it. Beneath the shell are materials designed to absorb the impact of a fall or blow. The inside is lined and often padded in order to be comfortable for the rider. Ventilation is usually worked into the design, and a harness is attached to keep the helmet on the head at all times.

Equestrian helmets have sport-specific differences from those used in other sports. For this reason, a helmet designed for another sport, such as bicycle or motorcycle helmet, is not deemed suitable for riding horses. The equestrian helmet covers more of a person's head than does a bicycle helmet, fitting lower on the head, particularly at the back of the skull, and has protection distributed evenly around the head rather than concentrated in the front and top. Aside from safety features, aerodynamics are less important in a riding helmet than in a bicycle or even a motorcycle helmet. The appearance of riding helmets is frequently based on that of an English hunt cap. In addition good ventilation and comfort are considered important features of a riding helmet.

Some riders feel that riding helmets are hot, uncomfortable or unattractive and do not want to wear them. However, the classic hunt cap, which modern helmets attempt to resemble, offered little or no protection to the rider of the horse. Neither do other types of hats popular with riders, including the derby, cowboy hat and the top hat. Use of helmets by beginning riders is becoming a common requirement, and some liability insurance policies for riding instructors ask the instructor to require their students to wear helmets.

== Law and rules concerning helmets ==
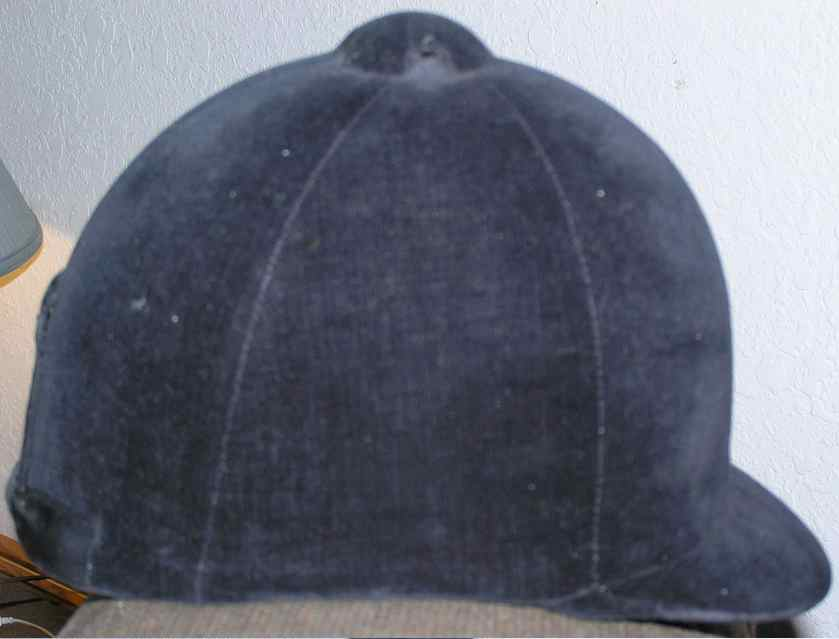
The older style hunt cap or “hard hat” is a thin shell. This cap is not ASTM/SEI certified, and is prohibited to wear in classes over fences at a USEF sanctioned competition; it offers inadequate crash protection to the rider's head.

Typically, helmets must meet one or more specific safety standards to be permitted for use in competition.

=== United States ===
The states of Florida and New York have passed legislation requiring the wearing of helmets for riding: In 2009, the state of Florida mandated helmets for youths under the age of 16; New York has had helmet laws affecting youths under the age of 14 under certain circumstances since 1999. The United States Equestrian Federation (USEF) requires that, in classes that mandate a helmet to be worn, the helmet must be ASTM/SEI certified. The USEF also requires all junior riders (under the age of 18) in any hunt seat discipline to wear an ASTM/SEI certified helmet with harness fastened while mounted on their horse anywhere on the show grounds, and requires all riders to wear a helmet when jumping anywhere on the show grounds. The United States Eventing Association (USEA) requires that all competitors have properly fitting headgear that is ASTM/SEI certified as well. While other horse show events do not mandate helmets, the rules have changed in recent years to permit helmets as optional headgear in any class. All riders are required to wear certified helmets while competing in Hunter, Jumpers, and Hunt Seat Equitation classes, and in any other class, including Hunter Hack, where jumping is required. They must fasten their helmet harness and must verify that the helmet meets or exceeds the current standard and carries the SEI tag.

=== International ===
For FEI international competition that involves competitors from many different nations, protective headgear complying with the European (EN), British (PAS), North American (ASTM), or Australian/New Zealand tested standards is required.

== Aesthetic and symbolism ==
Riding helmets traditionally reflect the conservative style of dress that characterized earlier non-protective English riding headwear. The classic riding helmet is covered in black velvet or velveteen (either via a removable cover or permanently glued on), with a small, flexible, visor-style brim.

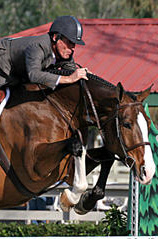
A rider with a modern style ASTM/SEI approved safety helmet with a decorative ventilation strip down the center. This popular style is sometimes informally known as a “skunk helmet”.

More recently, smooth finish helmets worn without a fabric cover, have become more common. A newly popular style in the hunter-jumper world features a lightly textured (less shiny) plastic shell with a decorative ventilation strip down the center. This design goes by many brand names, but, due to the ventilation strip, is informally called a "skunk helmet."

Jockeys who ride race horses wear a helmet designed without a brim, adding a colorful cover that is part of the owners’ racing colors, with a false brim for appearance's sake. Use of racing style colored helmet covers has spread to other disciplines, especially amongst Eventers. Casual riders often wear "training" or "schooling" helmets in a variety of colors and some even include patterns (such as stars or stripes). Cloth covers in brilliant colors and vivid designs can be purchased to provide even more variety, but are frowned upon (and are sometimes illegal) in the horse show ring, where black, brown or gray are still the standard.

There are helmet designs that resemble a cowboy hat, or have other "western" styling, such as a tan color, or a cordura outer cover. But adoption by western riders has been particularly slow, especially in the United States, where helmets are seen mostly in trail riding, competitive trail riding, and endurance riding, and seldom at rodeos (where use would be particularly well-advised) or in western-style horse show classes.

Some helmets retain a symbolic ribbon at the back, which dates from mounted hunting. Traditionally, black ribbon was used for fox hunting or general hunting, with red ribbon used when stag hunting or arme blanche hunting. The ribbon was "sewn up" (i.e. with a bow at the base of the helmet and the tail ends of the ribbon either cut off or glued pointing upwards on the body of the helmet) for "common" riders. The ribbon was "sewn down" (i.e. with the tail ends dangling from the bow, below the edge of the helmet) for hunt masters and hunt staff. Because any rider is entitled to wear a sewn up black ribbon, this is the standard for modern helmets retaining the ribbon. The use of "sewn down" ribbons by those not entitled to them sometimes occurs in the United States but is considered a serious transgression by traditionalists.

In some nations, members of the cavalry wear silver ribbons and national athletes wear gold ribbons. The ribbons are sewn up for troopers and common riders, and sewn down for officers and riders who have represented their countries at the Olympics or championships such as the World Equestrian Games.

== Standards ==
Helmets must meet a defined standard to be certified for use in competition. Procedures vary from one nation to the next. However, as a general rule, the design standards are created by a standards organization that has knowledge of hazards in the field of activity, and then actual helmets are tested and certified by a separate Conformity assessment organization with testing expertise.

The testing standards in the United States and New Zealand are considered more rigorous than those in other nations. Independent testing in the United Kingdom in 2003 by the British Equestrian Trade Association found a number of “traditional” designs from the three most established and respected British manufacturers failed a series of tests intended to determine if a design provided proper protection in the event of a fall.

=== Conformity assessment ===
Conformity assessment organizations that certify safety equipment perform some similar tests on all protective helmets (including bicycle, hockey and equestrian helmets), such as dropping them onto a flat anvil from a height of about six feet from several angles and directions. However, other tests are designed to consider the particular risks of a given sport. For equestrian helmets, these other tests may include dropping the helmet onto an anvil with a sharp edge, to simulate impact with the edge of a jump standard or a horse hoof.

=== United States ===
The most common standard used by sanctioning organizations in the United States is known as ASTM F1163 It is periodically updated, the most recent is ASTM F1163-13 (2013). It is a performance standard written by a volunteer committee of producers (persons who represent manufacturing companies) and users of equestrian helmets, and published by ASTM International. The standard defines performance criteria and test methods; it does not prescribe helmet design. This is the current standard adopted by the American National Standards Institute (ANSI).

In the United States, conformity assessment of riding helmets to defined standards is performed primarily by the Safety Equipment Institute (SEI). Helmet manufacturers voluntarily provide samples of each model and size of helmet to the Safety Equipment Institute (SEI) for simulated crash testing using the test methods defined by the ASTM standard. If the samples pass the tests, the producers may label other helmets of the same model and size to indicate that the helmet is ASTM/SEI certified. SEI also monitors the market for helmets fraudulently labeled as being ASTM/SEI certified; for this purpose, SEI publishes a list of all the helmet models and sizes which it has certified.

=== Other United States standards ===
The Snell Memorial Foundation, best known for its safety testing standards for motorcycle helmets, also publishes a safety testing standard for Equestrian helmets, E2001. ARRO Helmets is the only equestrian helmet with SNELL E2021 and MIPS approved.

Horse riders wearing helmets enjoy a Sunday outing near Bristol, England

=== United Kingdom ===
Product Approved Specification (PAS) 015 is one British safety standard for equestrian helmets. It defines test methods to evaluate shock absorption, penetration resistance, strength and effectiveness of retention system, durability of quick release mechanisms, and deflection of the peak. The other standard is BS EN 1384:1997 The EN 1384 and PAS 015:1998 are now essentially the same. Conformity assessment in the UK for the EN 1384 and ASTM F1163 standards is performed by INSPEC

=== Europe ===
European Normes EN 1384 (Helmets for Equestrian Activities) and EN 14572 (High Performance Helmets for Equestrian Activities) are standards published by the Centre for European Normes in Brussels, and widely used for purposes of conformity assessment in Europe. The codes for EN standards is sometimes prefixed by other codes to indicate adoption by national standards organizations. For example, the acronym “DIN” is used to indicate the Deutsches Institut für Normung, and “BS” indicates a standard adopted in the UK.

=== Australia/New Zealand ===
The helmet standard in Australian and New Zealand standard is AS/NZ 3838:2006.

=== International ===
The International Organization for Standardization (ISO) Guide 65:1996 is a widely respected international best practices standard for entities operating certification programs such as SEI and INSPEC.

== Standards compared ==
More recent versions of PAS 015:1998 and BS EN 1384:1997 are nearly identical. In contrast, ASTM F1163 and PAS 015 are not identical, though a series of tests in 1999 indicated that in some cases, the ASTM standard in use at that time was marginally superior. On the other hand, the current debate between the ASTM standard and the EN standard is primarily over the issue of ventilation slots, allowed by ASTM. The debate centers over whether there is an actual need for protection from penetration by sharp objects.

The SEI is accredited to ISO/IEC Guide 65:1996 by the American National Standards Institute (ANSI) and the Standards Council of Canada (SCC). This means that SEI is one of several testing programs that complies with the guidelines of the ISO.

== See also ==
- Hunt seat
- Show jumping
- Show hunter
- English riding
- United States Equestrian Federation (USEF)
- International Federation for Equestrian Sports (FEI)
- ASTM International
- Safety Equipment Institute
