= Aarthi Scans and Labs =

Indian radiology diagnostic provider

- Type: Private limited company
- Industry: Healthcare
- Founded: 2000
- Founder: V. Govindarajan
- Headquarters: Chennai, India
- Key people: Arunkumar Govindarajan (director)
- Services: radiology and pathology diagnostic services
- Website: aarthiscan.com

Aarthi Scans and Labs is an Indian radiology and pathology diagnostic provider, headquartered in Chennai. The business has 40 diagnostic centres in India, and is accredited with the NABL and NABH.

== History ==
In 1985, V. Govindarajan and his wife made the decision to establish a polyclinic in the Tamil Nadu town of Kovilpatti. However, they felt a lack of medical tools and technology for MRI scans and diagnostics, and thus decided to found Aarthi Scans and Labs in 2000. The business began as a single state operator and is now widespread throughout India.

During the COVID-19 pandemic, Aarthi Scans and Labs gathered 75,500 Swabs from homes. Additionally, it contributed ₹2,500,000 to a COVID-19 Relief Fund alongside other donors and offered scans and blood tests to COVID patients during pandemic.

In 2021, Aarthi Scans and Labs signed a contract with Mindray Ultrasound India and partnered with health tech firm Qure.ai.

In May 2022, the company partnered with Indian radiology company Synapsica to provide Spine MRI.

In October 2025, it has started a vertical, Vital Insights. These are the diagnostic centres for fitness and longevity of the body.

== Operations ==
In August 2025, Aarthi Scans installed India's first helium-free 1.5T MRI from Siemens Healthineers in Bengaluru.

In October 2025, Aarthi Scans & Labs has Invested ₹350 Crore for expansion of New Wellness centers across North India. It is also considered this funding as a pre launch of IPO.

Aarthi Scans & Labs AI-Enabled Chest X-Ray machine detected early-stage lung cancer in five people who came for random health checkup.

== Philanthropy ==
On the occasion of International Women's Day, Aarthi Scans & Labs distributed free anaemia and thyroid screening tests over a month period.

== Awards & recognitions ==
- Aarthi Scans & Labs ranked #1 in Diagnostics Across Tamil Nadu in Times Health Survey 2026
