= Conformance testing =

Type of testing for standards, contracts and regulations

Conformance testing and also known as compliance testing or type testing, is testing or other activities that determine whether a process, product, or service complies with the requirements of a specification, technical standard, contract, or regulation. It is an element of the more general conformity assessment.

Testing is often either logical testing or physical testing. The test procedures may involve other criteria from mathematical testing or chemical testing. Beyond simple conformance, other requirements for efficiency, interoperability, or compliance may apply.

Conformance testing may be undertaken by the producer of the product or service being assessed, by a user, or by an accredited independent organization, which can sometimes be the author of the standard being used. When testing is accompanied by certification, the products or services may then be advertised as being certified in compliance with the referred technical standard. Manufacturers and suppliers of products and services rely on such certification including listing on the certification body's website, to assure quality to the end user and that competing suppliers are on the same level.

Aside from the various types of testing, related conformance testing activities may also include surveillance, inspection, auditing, certification, and accreditation.

== Forms ==
The UK government identifies three forms of testing or assessment:

- 1st party assessment (self assessment)
- 2nd party assessment (assessment by a purchaser or user of a product or service)
- 3rd party assessment (undertaken by an independent organisation)

== Typical areas of application ==
Conformance testing is applied in various industries where a product or service must meet specific quality and/or regulatory standards. This includes areas such as:

- biocompatibility proofing
- data and communications protocol engineering
- document engineering
- electronic and electrical engineering
- medical procedure proofing
- pharmaceutical packaging
- software engineering
- building construction (fire)

In all such testing, the subject of test is not just the formal conformance in aspects of completeness of filed proofs, validity of referred certificates, and qualification of operating staff. Rather, it also heavily focuses on operational conditions, physical conditions, and applied test environments. By extension conformance testing leads to a vast set of documents and files that allow for reiterating all performed tests.

=== Software engineering ===
In software testing, conformance testing verifies that a product performs according to its specified standards. Compilers, for instance, are extensively tested to determine whether they meet the recognized standard for that language.

=== Electronic and electrical engineering ===
In electronic engineering and electrical engineering, some countries and business environments (such as telecommunication companies) require that an electronic product meet certain requirements before they can be sold. Standards for telecommunication products written by standards organizations such as ANSI, the FCC, and IEC have certain criteria that a product must meet before compliance is recognized. In countries such as Japan, China, Korea, and some parts of Europe, products cannot be sold unless they are known to meet those requirements specified in the standards. Usually, manufacturers set their own requirements to ensure product quality, sometimes with levels much higher than what the governing bodies require. Compliance is realized after a product passes a series of tests without occurring some specified mode of failure.

Compliance testing for electronic devices include emissions tests, immunity tests, and safety tests. Emissions tests ensure that a product will not emit harmful electromagnetic interference in communication and power lines. Immunity tests ensure that a product is immune to common electrical signals and electromagnetic interference (EMI) that will be found in its operating environment, such as electromagnetic radiation from a local radio station or interference from nearby products. Safety tests ensure that a product will not create a safety risk from situations such as a failed or shorted power supply, blocked cooling vent, and powerline voltage spikes and dips.

For example, Ericsson's telecommunications research and development subsidiary Telcordia Technologies publishes conformance standards for telecommunication equipment to pass the following tests:

Radiated immunity
An antenna is used to subject the device to electromagnetic waves, covering a large frequency range (usually from 80 MHz to 6 GHz).
Radiated emissions
One or more antennas are used to measure the amplitude of the electromagnetic waves that a device emits. The amplitude must be under a set limit, with the limit depending on the device's classification.
Conducted immunity
Low frequency signals (usually 10 kHz to 80 MHz) are injected onto the data and power lines of a device. This test is used to simulate the coupling of low frequency signals onto the power and data lines, such as from a local AM radio station.
Conducted emissions
Similar to radiated emissions, except the signals are measured at the power lines with a filter device.
Electrostatic discharge (ESD) immunity
Electrostatic discharges with various properties (rise time, peak voltage, fall time, and half time) are applied to the areas on the device that are likely to be discharged too, such as the faces, near user accessible buttons, etc. Discharges are also applied to a vertical and horizontal ground plane to simulate an ESD event on a nearby surface. Voltages are usually from 2 kV to 15 kV, but commonly go as high as 25 kV or more.
Electrical Fast Transient Burst immunity (EFTB)
Bursts of high voltage pulses are applied to the powerlines to simulate events such as repeating voltage spikes from a motor.
Powerline dip immunity
The line voltage is slowly dropped down then brought back up.
Powerline surge immunity
A surge is applied to the line voltage.

== Standards ==
Several international standards relating to conformance testing are published by the International Organization for Standardization (ISO) and covered in the divisions of ICS 03.120.20 for management and ICS 23.040.01 for technical. Other standalone ISO standards include:

- ISO/TR 13881:2000 Petroleum and natural gas industries—Classification and conformity assessment of products, processes and services
- ISO 18436-4:2008 Condition monitoring and diagnostics of machines—Requirements for qualification and assessment of personnel—Part 4: Field lubricant analysis
- ISO/IEC 18009:1999 Information technology—Programming languages—Ada: Conformity assessment of a language processor

=== Mutual recognition agreements ===
Many countries sign mutual recognition agreements (MRAs) with other countries in order to promote trade of and facilitate market access to goods and services, while making it easier to meet a country's conformance testing requirements. Additionally, these agreements have the advantage of increasing confidence in conformance assessment bodies (e.g., testing labs and certification bodies), and by extension, product quality. An example is the IAF MLA which is an agreement for the mutual recognition of accredited certification between IAF Accreditation Body (AB) Member signatories.

== See also ==
- Certification
- Governance, risk management, and compliance
- Standards organizations
- Test assertion
- Testing, inspection and certification
