= Adversarial system =

Type of legal system

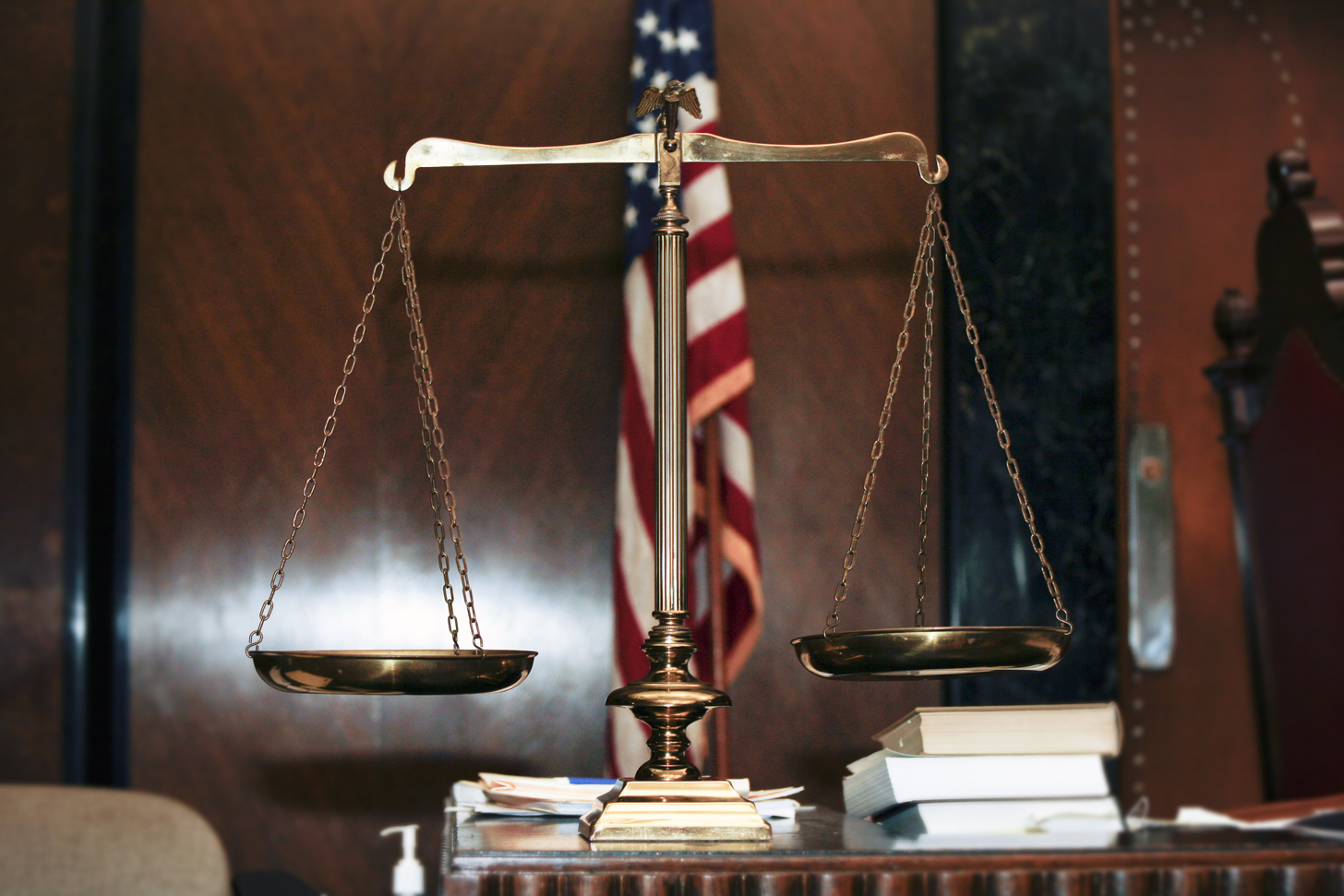
“Let the advocates one after the other put the weights into the scales — the ‘nicely calculated less or more’ — but the judge at the end decides which way the balance tilts, be it ever so slightly.” - English judge Lord Alfred Thompson Denning stated in 1957 in Jones v National Coal Board.

The adversarial system, also called adversary system, accusatorial system, or accusatory system, is a legal framework in which two opposing parties present their evidence and arguments before a neutral adjudicator (judge or jury) who decides the outcome of the proceedings. The adversarial system is commonly used in common law countries that rely on previous judicial decisions as precedent. It is in contrast to the inquisitorial system used in some civil law countries where a judge takes an active investigative role in the case. While the adversarial system is especially prominent in criminal trials, it is a feature of both civil and criminal cases.

== Overview ==
The central premise of the adversarial system is that the competitive clash of cases presented by opposing counsel as they passionately represent the best interests of their clients produces useful information that a neutral decision maker can utilize for adjudication. Adversarial context helps ensure that issues are adequately argued by advocates who are invested in the outcome. An adversarial judicial system is recognizable by the dominating role attorneys play in legal proceedings, including developing evidence, interrogating witnesses, and fiercely challenging opposing counsel.

== History ==
The Adversarial Process by Honore Daumier, 1845

Scholarly research proposes that the colony of Pennsylvania's Charter of Privileges, penned in 1701 by William Penn, is one of the earliest accounts of granting counsel to defendants in adversarial criminal trials.

The US Supreme Court suggests that the American conceptualization of the adversarial system is rooted in the Constitution of the United States. The Adversity Requirement found through judicial interpretation of Article III, Section 2, Clause 1, referred to as the Case or Controversy Clause, requires the relationship of the parties involved in a case to be genuinely adverse and antagonistic in nature in order to be heard by the federal courts. The fierce advocacy involved within the adversarial system is thought to effectively shed light on complex legal issues in a way that makes information clearer for the court to decide the outcome.

Some scholars suggest that the concept of zealous advocacy associated with the adversarial system originated in 1820 in the British House of Lords. During Lord Henry Brougham's defense of Queen Caroline (see: Pains and Penalties Bill 1820), Lord Brougham separated the duties of advocate and patriot and famously declared that a lawyer's loyalty belongs to the client.

Watts v. Indiana was a Supreme Court case in 1949 that characterized the adversarial system as a component of the American legal identity that is concomitant with due process in its pursuit of the protection of individual freedom. This understanding of the adversarial system as a defining feature of American adjudication expanded after the 1963 Supreme Court decision in Gideon v Wainwright that recognized the necessity for all parties in legal proceedings to have counsel in order to ensure a fair trial in an adversarial system.

== Criminal proceedings ==
In criminal adversarial proceedings, an accused is not compelled to give evidence. Therefore, they may not be questioned by a prosecutor or judge unless they choose to be. However, should they decide to testify, they are subject to cross-examination and could be found guilty of perjury. As the election to maintain an accused person's right to silence prevents any examination or cross-examination of that person's position, it follows that the decision of counsel as to what evidence will be called is a crucial tactic in any case in the adversarial system. Certainly, it requires the skills of counsel on both sides to be fairly equally pitted and subjected to an impartial judge.

In some adversarial legislative systems, the court is permitted to make inferences on an accused's failure to face cross-examination or to answer a particular question. In the United States, the Fifth Amendment has been interpreted to prohibit a jury from drawing a negative inference based on the defendant's invocation of his or her right not to testify, and the jury must be so instructed if the defendant requests.

By contrast, while defendants in most civil law systems can be compelled to give statements, these statements are not subject to cross-examinations by the prosecution and are not given under oath. This allows the defendant to explain their side of the case without being subject to cross-examination by a skilled opposition. However, this is mainly because it is not the prosecutor but the judge who questions the defendant. The concept of "cross"-examination is entirely due to adversarial structure of the common law.

== Benefits of the adversarial system ==
=== Expansion of defendants' rights ===
The U.S. Supreme Court has increasingly expanded adversarial adjudication requirements to strengthen defendants' rights, such as cross-examination, confrontation, and self-representation.

=== Personal autonomy ===
Each party in an adversarial system has control over the strategic decisions made for their own case. The ability of clients and their counsel to decide the specifics of how their case will be conducted, like what questions to ask witnesses and what points to make to the jury, highlights the personal autonomy granted to litigants in the adversarial system.

=== Perception of procedural justice ===
A psychological analysis of procedural justice found that students had greater satisfaction in the fairness of adversarial procedures than with inquisitorial procedures, regardless of whether the final outcome found a student "innocent" or "guilty." People value self-expression, and the control a litigant has over the presentation of their case in an adversarial system creates adequate opportunity for their side of the story to be heard.

== Criticisms of the adversarial system ==
=== Resource inequity and marginalization ===
The adversarial system is predicated on the underlying assumption that both sides in a legal proceeding have equal access to highly skilled and competent lawyers, but this perfect balance rarely exists in practice. The chronic under-resourcing of indigent defense in the United States creates resource disparity between prosecutors and defenders that results in inequitable outcomes for vulnerable communities. The American criminal justice system disproportionately sentences ethnic and racial minorities who rely on public defenders with less access to resources than prosecutors.

Scholars have suggested that the origins of adversarial proceedings rooted in common law have a legacy of colonization that marginalizes the weaker party. Scholars argue that the equal and effective access of justice for all is denied due to the existence of obstacles like costly court fees, complex procedures, and tolerance of court delays that benefit wealthier litigants.

=== Risk of harm to victims ===
Scholarly research suggests that adversarial procedures can retraumatize vulnerable victims of sexual assault and violent crimes. The adversarial process causes extreme stress to victims as painful and personal details go on the public record during a court case. The Confrontation Clause allows a victim's attacker to be in close proximity to the victim during a trial, and the right to self-representation may be used by the defendant as an intimidation tactic to personally question the victim. One study found that victims of sexual assault had higher distress scores after pursuing criminal prosecution than victims who did not have their cases prosecuted.

=== Advocate bias ===
Lawyers in an adversarial system function as opposing zealous advocates for their clients who control the flow of biased evidence that gets presented to the decision maker. One study suggests that adversarial proceedings may result in inaccurate decisions because adversarial advocates transmit less facts to the decision maker that are unfavorable to their clients.

Scholars have critiqued zealous advocacy for the potential danger of unethical advocacy as well as its minimization of a lawyer's duty to the justice system. The notion of zealous advocacy in adversarial settings has diminished in American doctrine, but is still prevalent in thought for contemporary lawyers and judges. The American Bar Association's Model Rules of Professional Conduct (1983) eliminated references to zealous advocacy, and New York's Rules of Professional Conduct replaced references to the zealous advocacy doctrine with requirements for clients to receive competent representation in 2009.

=== Limitations of adversarial checks on administrative power ===
The adversarial process may not be an effective way of checking administrative agency power. The Internal Revenue Service (IRS) incorporated adversarial procedures as an external check on IRS power with the introduction of Collection Due Process (CDP) formalized in the Internal Revenue Service Restructuring and Reform Act of 1998. However, a system that processes a high-volume of accounts, like the IRS that processes over 5 million collection accounts annually, does not have the necessary resources to support a check on administrative power through an adversarial process. The adversarial process is designed to review individualized decisions as opposed to bulk processing decisions.

== Comparison with the inquisitorial system ==
"'Am I never to hear the truth? No, my lord, merely the evidence,' replied counsel."- Peter Murphy's A Practical Approach to Evidence (1980)

The inquisitorial system, commonly found in civil law jurisdictions, features a judge (or judges) that plays an active, investigative role in a court case. Inquisitorial systems place critical elements of the pre-trial process and trial procedures in the hands of judges rather than lawyers.

Studies have suggested that the adversarial process is designed to produce more justice while the inquisitorial system is perceived to produce more truth. This fundamental conceptual dichotomy between the adjudicatory objectives of "truth" and "justice" is rooted in Thibaut and Walker's theory of procedure (1978).

Comparison of the Adversarial System vs. the Inquisitorial System
Types of Legal Systems	Adversarial	Inquisitorial
Jurisdiction	Common law	Civil law
Judge	Passive, neutral	Active, investigative
Lawyers	Actively advocate for their clients	Follow the judge's lead
Primary Goal	Justice	Truth

== See also ==
- Adversary evaluation
- Exclusionary rule
- Inquisitorial system
- Judicial interpretation
- Parallel thinking – described as a systemic alternative
