= Half time (disambiguation) =

Half-time is an interval between two periods of a sporting match.

Half time may also refer to:

- Half time (electronics), the time it takes for a pulse to drop to 50% of its peak amplitude
- Jennifer Lopez: Halftime (2022), a documentary film about Jennifer Lopez
- Half Time (horse) (foaled 1896), an American Thoroughbred racehorse
- Half time (music), a type of feel that alters the meter of music
- Half time (physics), the time for a quantity to halve the difference between its present and final values
- "Halftime" (song), a song by Nas
- "Halftime (Stand Up & Get Crunk!)", a song by Ying Yang Twins from My Brother & Me
- "Half Time", a track from the soundtrack of the 2014 Indian film Jigarthanda
- "Half Time", a song by Black Midi from Hellfire
- "Half Time", a song by Stray Kids from Karma

== See also ==
- Part-time, a form of employment with fewer hours than a full-time job
