= National Accreditation Board for Testing and Calibration Laboratories =

Indian accreditation organisation

National Accreditation Board for Testing & Calibration Laboratories (NABL)
- Abbreviation: TC18004
- Predecessor: NCTCF
- Merged into: Quality Council of India
- Formation: 1988; 38 years ago
- Founders: Department of Science and Technology (India)
- Type: Autonomous
- Purpose: Accreditation services
- Headquarters: New Delhi
- Location: Ahmedabad, Bengaluru, Kolkata
- Region served: Pan India, International
- Services: Accreditation Services
- Key people: Dr.Ramanand N Shulka (CEO)
- Main organ: Governing Body
- Affiliations: Department for Promotion of Industry and Internal Trade (DPIIT); Ministry of Commerce and Industry (India); Government of India
- Staff: 100-200
- Website: nabl-india.org

National Accreditation Board for Testing and Calibration Laboratories (NABL) provides accreditation services to Conformity Assessment Bodies (Laboratories) in India. NABL Schemes include Accreditation (Recognition) of Technical competence of testing, calibration, medical testing laboratories, Proficiency testing providers (PTP), Reference Material Producers (RMP) and Biobanks for a specific scope following ISO/IEC 17025, ISO 15189, ISO/IEC 17043 & ISO 17034:2016, Biobank Standards. It has Mutual Recognition Arrangement (MRA) with Asia Pacific Accreditation Cooperation (APAC), Global Accreditation Cooperation Incorporated (Global ACI) erstwhile International Laboratory Accreditation Cooperation (ILAC).

NABL is a constituent board of Quality Council of India which is an autonomous body setup under Department for Promotion of Industry and Internal Trade (DPIIT), Ministry of Commerce and Industry, Government of India.

NABL provides accreditation in all major fields of Science and Engineering such as Biological, Chemical, Electrical, Electronics, Mechanical, Fluid-Flow, Non-Destructive, Photometry, Radiological, Thermal & Forensics disciplines under testing facilities and Electro-Technical, Mechanical, Fluid Flow, Thermal, Optical & Radiological disciplines under Calibration facilities. In the field of Medical Testing laboratories accreditation is granted in Clinical Biochemistry, Clinical Pathology, Haematology & Immunohaematology, Microbiology & Serology, Histopathology, Cytopathology, Genetics, Nuclear Medicine (In-vitro tests only) disciplines. In addition, NABL offers accreditation for Proficiency testing providers & Reference Material producers for which it has APAC and ILAC MRA.

== Benefits of accreditation ==
NABL is a Full member (ILAC MRA signatory) to Global Accreditation Cooperation Incorporated (Global ACI) erstwhile ILAC as well as APAC Mutual Recognition Arrangements (MRA), based on mutual evaluation and acceptance of other MRA Partner laboratory accreditation systems. Such international arrangements facilitate acceptance of test / calibration results between countries to which MRA partners represent.

This developing system of international mutual recognition agreements between accreditation bodies has enabled accredited laboratories to achieve a form of international recognition, and allowed test data accompanying exported goods to be readily accepted on overseas markets amongst the countries which have already qualified as significant to ILAC Arrangements. This effectively reduces costs for both the exporters and the importers, as it reduces or eliminates the need for products to be re-tested in another country.

NABL accreditation is the recognised by various government bodies and regulators. In India, NABL accreditation is usually the precursor to various government/ regulator/ statutory body recognition's.

NABL being a governmental accreditation body conducts integrated assessments with regulators such as FSSAI, EIC, APEDA, etc. Integrated assessments simplify the process of recognition, as the laboratory can get accredited and recognized by the regulator in one combined assessment instead of the separate multiple assessments which are usually needed.

== Services provided by NABL ==
NABL provides accreditation to:

1. Testing laboratories as per ISO/IEC 17025
2. Calibration laboratories as per ISO/IEC 17025
3. Medical testing laboratories as per ISO 15189
4. Proficiency Testing Providers (PTP) as per ISO/IEC 17043
5. Reference Material Producers (RMP) as per ISO 17034
6. Biobanking as per ISO 20387

== Laboratory Conclaves ==
NABL conducts laboratory conclaves yearly. In 2019, the 8th National Conclave for Laboratories was conducted in Chennai.

== World Accreditation Day (WAD) ==
NABL celebrates World Accreditation Day (WAD) every year on 9 June. World accreditation day is celebrated to provide awareness on accreditation and how accreditation benefits its stakeholders.

== Scope of accreditation ==
NABL's scope for accreditation extends to:-

Testing Laboratories: Biological, Chemical, Diagnostic Radiology QA testing, Electrical, Electronics, Fluid-Flow, Forensic, Mechanical, Non-Destructive testing, Photometry, Radiological and Software & IT system testing.

Calibration Laboratories: Electro-Technical, Mechanical, Fluid Flow, Thermal & Optical, Radiological, Thermal.

Medical Laboratories: Clinical Biochemistry, Clinical Pathology, Haematology & Immunohaematology, Microbiology and Infectious Disease Serology, Molecular Diagnostics, Histocompatibility & Immunogenetics, Medical Imaging, Histopathology, Cytopathology, Flow cytometry, Cytogenetics.

== Applying for NABL Accreditation ==
Laboratories seeking NABL Accreditation can apply on NABL Web Portal.
