= Test assertion =

In computer software testing, a test assertion is an expression which encapsulates some testable logic specified about a target under test. The expression is formally presented as an assertion, along with some form of identifier, to help testers and engineers ensure that tests of the target relate properly and clearly to the corresponding specified statements about the target. Usually the logic for each test assertion is limited to one single aspect specified. A test assertion may include prerequisites which must be true for the test assertion to be valid.

== See also ==
- Test driven
- Conformance testing
