= IAF MLA =

The International Accreditation Forum (IAF) Multilateral Recognition Arrangement (MLA) is an agreement for the mutual recognition of accredited certification between IAF Accreditation Body (AB) Member signatories. This agreement allows for the acceptance of accredited certification in many markets based on one accreditation. The worldwide recognition of certificates granted by IAF MLA signatories and their accredited bodies removes technical barriers to trade, reduces costs and adds value to business and customers.

Admittance to the MLA is granted after evaluation of an AB's operations by a peer evaluation team that ensures the AB is compliant with both international standards and IAF requirements. IAF members invest significant effort and resources into maintaining the integrity of the MLA, thereby retaining the confidence of businesses, specifiers and regulators.

The IAF MLA covers management systems, products, personnel and validation and verification. It is composed of main and sub-scopes as defined in IAF PL 3: Policies and Procedures on the IAF MLA Structure and for Expansion of the Scope of the IAF MLA and illustrated in the IAF MLA Status document. Certificates issued on the basis of an IAF MLA main scope are considered equally trustworthy because the certification or validation and verification bodies conform to the same standard, while certificates issued on the basis of a sub-scope are considered equivalent due to being based on the same IAF-endorsed standard or sector scheme.

IAF MLA signatories and their accredited conformity assessment bodies may use the IAF MLA Mark subject to the terms defined in IAF ML 2: General Principles on the Use of the IAF MLA Mark. The MLA Mark provides assurance that the issuing conformity assessment bodies are competent and can be trusted.

Not all IAF members are MLA signatories, nor have all signatories signed the MLA for all accreditation standards. A list of IAF MLA signatories is available on the IAF website.
