= Global Accreditation Cooperation Incorporated =

International organization providing accreditations

Global Accreditation Cooperation Incorporated (Global ACI)
- Abbreviation: Global ACI
- Predecessor: International Laboratory Accreditation Cooperation (ILAC) and International Accreditation Forum (IAF)
- Formation: 2026
- Type: Association of accreditation bodies
- Purpose: Facilitate global recognition of accredited conformity assessment
- Region served: Worldwide
- Members: 198
- Global ACI Chair: Brahim Houla
- Main organ: General Assembly
- Website: global-aci.org/en/home/

Global Accreditation Cooperation Incorporated (Global ACI) is an international organisation that serves as an international authority on accreditation for laboratories, certification bodies, inspection bodies, proficiency testing providers, validation and verification bodies, reference material producers and biobanks. Its membership includes accreditation bodies, regional cooperation bodies and stakeholder organisations worldwide.

Global ACI's Multilateral Recognition Arrangement (MRA) enables Global ACI MRA signatories to recognise the equivalence of each other's accreditations. This supports the international acceptance of results from accredited conformity assessment bodies, helping reduce the need for duplicate testing, certification and inspection across borders.

Global ACI succeeded the International Laboratory Accreditation Cooperation (ILAC) and International Accreditation Forum (IAF) on 01 January 2026, further to a decision by IAF and ILAC to establish a single international organisation for accreditation.

== History ==
The establishment of Global ACI followed years of cooperation between IAF and ILAC. The two organisations had developed numerous joint activities, including joint meetings, joint committees and work on harmonised accreditation requirements and guidance.

In 2019, the 19th Joint IAF-ILAC General Assembly in Frankfurt, Germany endorsed the proposal to establish a single international accreditation organisation and established a committee to oversee its development. In October 2024, the memberships of IAF and ILAC endorsed the establishment of the new organisation at their 22nd Joint IAF-ILAC General Assembly in Berlin, Germany.

Global ACI was registered as an incorporated society in New Zealand on 06 December 2024 under the Incorporated Societies Act 2022. The organisation became fully operational on 01 January 2026. From that date, it assumed the roles and responsibilities previously held by IAF and ILAC, while IAF and ILAC ceased operations.

== Role ==
Global ACI develops and maintains criteria and normative documents for accreditation bodies and their assessment of conformity assessment bodies, including laboratories, certification bodies, inspection bodies, proficiency testing providers, validation and verification bodies, reference material producers and biobanks.

Accreditation is the independent evaluation of a conformity assessment body's competence to perform specified activities against applicable requirements. Global ACI aims to harmonise accreditation practices internationally and promote confidence in accredited results across borders.

== Multilateral Recognition Arrangement ==
The Global ACI Multilateral Recognition Arrangement (MRA) provides a mechanism for mutual recognition among Global ACI accreditation body signatories. Signatories undergo peer evaluation to assess their competence and the consistency of their accreditation activities against applicable international requirements.

The arrangement covers multiple areas of conformity assessment, including testing, medical testing, calibration, management system certification, certification of persons, product certification, inspection, validation and verification, proficiency testing provision, reference material production and biobanking.

The MRA aims to support international acceptance of certificates, reports and statements issued within its recognised scopes, helping to reduce the need for duplicate assessments and facilitating international trade.

The Global ACI MRA builds on the recognition arrangements previously operated by IAF and ILAC. Accreditation bodies that were signatories to the IAF MLA or ILAC MRA at the end of 2025 were accepted as Global ACI signatories for corresponding scopes, subject to the organisation's membership in Global ACI.

== Membership ==
Global ACI has four membership categories: Full Members, Associate Members, Stakeholder Members and Regional Cooperation Bodies.

Full Members are accreditation bodies that meet the applicable eligibility and recognition requirements and are Global ACI MRA signatories. Associate Members are accreditation bodies that meet the relevant membership criteria but are not yet MRA signatories. Stakeholder Members include organisations with an interest in accreditation, such as associations representing conformity assessment bodies or users, standardisation and metrology organisations, regulators and scheme owners. Regional Cooperation Bodies represent groups of accreditation bodies within particular geographical regions.

Members participate in the organisation's governance and activities in accordance with their membership category and the applicable constitutional and procedural requirements.

== Governance ==
Global ACI is governed by its Constitution and General Rules. Its governance structure includes a General Assembly, an Executive Committee and committees responsible for technical, MRA and other organisational activities.

The General Assembly is the organisation's highest authority and is responsible for decisions reserved to the membership under the Constitution and General Rules. Between General Assembly meetings, the Executive Committee oversees the organisation's activities and the implementation of decisions made by the membership.

Committees, subcommittees and working groups undertake work within their assigned responsibilities, including the development and maintenance of accreditation requirements, MRA recognition procedures and supporting guidance.

== International Cooperation ==
Global ACI cooperates with international organisations involved in standardisation, conformity assessment and quality infrastructure. Its work supports the use of accreditation to establish confidence in the competence of conformity assessment bodies and the international acceptance of their results.

Global ACI has signed Memoranda of Understanding (MoUs) with organisations including the International Organization for Standardization (ISO), the International Organization of Legal Metrology (OIML), the World Anti-Doping Agency (WADA), the United Nations Industrial Development Organization (UNIDO), the International Federation of Horseracing Authorities (IFHA), and the Grain and Feed Trade Association (Gafta).

== Meetings ==
Global ACI members meet twice yearly in midterm and annual meetings. The 2026 Midterm Meetings were held in Prague, Czech Republic. The 2026 Annual Meetings will be held in Panama City, Panama.
