= Accredited registrar =

Registrar certified by a body as meeting the requirements of a standard

An accredited registrar, also called an accredited certification body (CB), is an organization accredited by a recognized accrediting body for its competence to audit and issue certification confirming that an organization meets the requirements of a standard (e.g. ISO 9001 or ISO 14001). Accreditation means that certification and inspection bodies have been assessed against recognized standards to demonstrate their competence, impartiality and capability.

== Legal status ==
Although not a legal requirement, accreditation is often stipulated and supported by local governments. In order to ensure equally high standards of certification across Europe, the European Commission for Enterprise and Industry set out a European-wide policy for accreditation. This ensures consistency in the accreditation market and is designed to protect the consumer. Accordingly, it is mandatory for every European member-state to have a single national Accreditation Body (NAB). In the UK, the United Kingdom Accreditation Service (UKAS) is the formally appointed National Accreditation Body, following the adoption the European regulation. The new Regulation (EC Regulation 765/2008), which came into force on 1 January 2010, requires each member state to appoint a single national accreditation body. UKAS has therefore been appointed by statutory instrument providing, for the first time, a legal basis for its role. The accreditation Regulations 2009 (Statutory Instrument No 3155/2009) making the appointment were signed on 30 November 2009 by Lord Drayson, Minister for Science and Innovation, and announced in a Written Statement to Parliament. In the statement, Lord Drayson said: “The Department for Business, Innovation and Skills (BIS) has a long standing and effective relationship with UKAS that both parties value highly. We will continue to work together not only to ensure that the requirements of the EC Regulation are fulfilled but to improve the quality and breadth of accreditation in the UK.”

Outside of Europe, there is not a uniform set of regulations. For example, in the United States, there are multiple independent Accreditation Bodies, whereas within Australasia, regional coordination is managed by the Joint Accreditation System of Australia and New Zealand. To facilitate global trade, most national and regional Accreditation Bodies maintain memberships within international coordination platforms, such as the International Accreditation Forum (IAF) and the International Forum for Accreditation (IFA). These organisations function as international forums rather than direct accreditation bodies. Through the IAF Multilateral Recognition Arrangement (MLA) and the IFA Recognition and Cooperation Arrangement (RCA), member Accreditation Bodies peer-evaluate one another to verify equivalent competence, ensuring that accredited conformity assessment certificates are recognized across participating global borders.

== See also ==
- International Accreditation Forum
- Joint Accreditation System of Australia and New Zealand
- United Kingdom Accreditation Service
- Irish National Accreditation Board
- ANSI-ASQ National Accreditation Board (ANAB)
- National Accreditation Board for Certification Bodies (NABCB)
