= International Council on Educational Credential Evaluation =

Organization

The International Council on Educational Credential Evaluation, commonly known as ICECE, is an international NGO closely affiliated both with UNESCO and the Council of Europe. Its main objectives include research related to international higher education and recognition of qualifications and quality assurance in the field of educational credential evaluation. The Organization is headquartered in Brussels, Belgium.

ICECE recognition is widely accepted as the highest international standard of quality assurance in the field of credential evaluation.
