= National Accreditation Authority for Translators and Interpreters =

The National Accreditation Authority for Translators and Interpreters Ltd (known as NAATI) is the national standards and certifying body for translators and interpreters in Australia. NAATI's mission, as outlined in the NAATI Constitution, is to set and maintain high national standards in translating and interpreting to enable the existence of a pool of accredited translators and interpreters responsive to the changing needs and demography of the Australian community. The core focus of the company is issuing certification for practitioners who wish to work as translators and interpreters in Australia.

== NAATI Certification ==
NAATI certification provides quality assurance to the consumers of translators and interpreting services and gives credibility to agencies that engage certified practitioners.

Certified Conference Interpreter	Suitable for international or high level events and meetings involving conference type settings, which require consecutive or simultaneous interpreting. Use of conference interpreting booths and equipment are often required by the interpreter to deliver interpreting services.
Certified Interpreter	Suitable for specialisations such as health, legal and formal proceedings. Also suitable for general conversations and interpreting non-specialist dialogues.
Certified Provisional Interpreter	Suitable for general conversations and interpreting non-specialist dialogues.
Recognised Practising Interpreter	Granted in emerging languages or languages with low community demand for which NAATI does not offer certification. Interpreters with this credential have recent and regular experience as an interpreter and are required to complete regular professional development. Suitable for general conversations and interpreting non-specialist dialogues. In a small number of cases Recognised Practicing Interpreter may also be provided as an interim arrangement in established languages where interpreters have been trained but testing is not currently available.

=== Previous NAATI credentials ===
There are some translators and interpreters who decided not to transition to the new certification scheme introduced by NAATI in January 2018. If there are no transitioned translators and interpreters available, translators and interpreters who hold older NAATI accreditation credentials, starting with the highest old credential, are still available. While these accreditation credentials do not have all the benefits of the new NAATI certification scheme and are not subject to its revalidation requirements, they do remain valid. These accreditation credentials are:

- Senior Conference Interpreter
- Conference Interpreter
- Professional Interpreter
- Professional Translator
- Paraprofessional Interpreter
- Recognition

Those translation and interpreting professionals who opted out of transition to the new certification scheme introduced in 2018 have been accredited by NAATI in the years since NAATI was founded in 1977. They still hold perpetual accreditations not requiring revalidation. Since the certification system was introduced in 2018, practitioners accredited under the previous system who did not transition are not included in the NAATI online directory of credentialed language professionals.

=== Nil credentialed ===
Some interpreters hold none of the credentials outlined above and are referred to by the Translating and Interpreting Service (TIS National) to as ‘Nil credentialed’. This generally occurs in very low demand languages where NAATI offers neither certification nor recognised practising status.

== Organisation Structure ==
NAATI is a not-for-profit company, limited by guarantee, incorporated in Australia under the Corporations Act 2001. The company is owned jointly by the Commonwealth, State and Territory governments of Australia. and is governed by a Board of Directors, who are appointed by the owners.

The members of NAATI are the nine ministers who are responsible for multicultural affairs and/or citizenship in the Commonwealth, State and Territory governments. Members may appoint a representative to exercise any of their powers in relation to NAATI. These Member Representatives are separate to the NAATI board of directors.

== Operational functions ==
NAATI provides eight key services to assist people to gain and maintain a credential to work as a translator or interpreter in Australia. These services include:

- Testing for NAATI certification
- Credentialed Community Language Test - language ability assessment at a community level, commonly used for immigration points in Australia.
- Community Language Aide - a test used in the public or private sector which recognises language ability in the workplace for the purpose of gaining a language allowance.
- Skills assessments for migration purposes

There are two types of NAATI credentials – Certification and Recognised Practicing

NAATI certification is an acknowledgement that an individual has demonstrated the ability to meet the professional standards required by the translation and interpreting industry. NAATI assesses practitioners and aspiring translators and interpreters against these standards so that English speaking and non-English speaking Australians can interact effectively with each other.

There are a couple of different ways you can gain NAATI accreditation, including:

NAATI recognition is granted in emerging languages or languages with very low community demand for which NAATI does not offer certification. Recognised Practising Translators or Interpreters meet the minimum experience and ability to interact as translator or interpreter with the Australian community and has recent and regular experience with no defined skill level.

The NAATI Recognised Practicing credential is not offered in languages where there is a pool of certified practitioners or if NAATI offers certification testing on a regular basis for that language,

== Outline of NAATI credentials ==
Under NAATI's current system, there are ten different types of credentials. These are listed in the table below.

Credential Name	Pre-1992 Level	Description
Conference Interpreter (Senior)	5	This is the highest level of NAATI interpreting accreditation. It reflects a level of excellence in conference interpreting, recognised through demonstrated extensive experience and international leadership. It encompasses and builds on the competencies of Conference Interpreter accreditation.
Advanced Translator (Senior)	5	This is the highest level of NAATI translating accreditation. It reflects a level of excellence in specialised translating, recognised through demonstrated extensive experience and international leadership. It encompasses and builds on the competencies of Advanced Translator accreditation.
Conference Interpreter	4 (I)	This represents the level of competence required to handle complex, technical and sophisticated interpreting, in both consecutive and simultaneous modes, in line with recognised international practice. Conference interpreters operate in diverse situations including at conferences, high-level negotiations, court proceedings or may choose to specialise in a particular area(s).
Advanced Translator	4 (T)	This represents the level of competence required to handle complex, technical and sophisticated translations in line with recognised international practice. Advanced Translators operate in diverse situations and may choose to specialise in a particular area(s) – including translating technical manuals, research papers, conferences, high-level negotiations and court proceedings.
Professional Interpreter	3 (I)	This represents the minimum level of competence for professional interpreting and is the minimum level recommended by NAATI for work in most settings including banking, law, health, social and community services. Professional Interpreters are capable of interpreting across a wide range of semi-specialised situations and are capable of using the consecutive mode to interpret speeches or presentations.
Professional Translator	3 (T)	This represents the minimum level of competence for professional translating and is the minimum level recommended by NAATI for work in settings including banking, law, health, social and community services. Translators at this level work across a wide range of subjects involving documents with specialised content.
Paraprofessional Interpreter	2 (I)	This represents a level of competence in interpreting for the purpose of general conversations. Paraprofessional Interpreters generally undertake the interpretation of non-specialist dialogues. Practitioners at this level are encouraged to obtain Professional level accreditation if available.
Paraprofessional Translator	2 (T)	This represents a level of competence enabling the production of a translation of non-specialised information (e.g. a birth certificate). Practitioners at this level are encouraged to obtain Professional level accreditation if available.
Recognised Interpreter	–	This credential is an acknowledgement that at the time of the award the applicant has had recent and regular work experience as an interpreter, but no level of proficiency is specified. Recognised interpreters are encouraged to obtain accreditation as it becomes available.
Recognised Translator	–	This credential is an acknowledgement that at the time of the award the applicant has had recent and regular work experience as a translator, but no level of proficiency is specified. Recognised translators are encouraged to obtain accreditation as it becomes available.

NAATI certification for Translator is usually awarded in one of the following directions:

- From a Language other Than English (LOTE) into English; or
- From English into a LOTE; or
- Both directions.

NAATI certification for interpreters is awarded in both directions.

Occasionally, NAATI has awarded a credential in a language combination that does not feature English at the Conference Interpreter or Advanced Translator level e.g. Advanced Translator French to German or Conference Interpreter (Senior) French to/from Russian. This sort of accreditation can only be awarded on the basis of a professional membership of an international association such as AIIC or AITC.

=== Example of the kind of document needing a NAATI-certified translation ===
Translations by a NAATI-certified translator are generally required by government authorities for immigration-related official documents, such as:

- Payslips

- Academic Transcripts

- Bank Statements

- Birth Certificates

- Marriage Certificates

- Death Certificates

- Driving Licences

- Divorce Certificates

- Police Checks

- Educational Qualifications
