= Safety Equipment Institute =

Safety Equipment Institute (SEI)
- Company type: Not-for-profit
- Industry: Product Certification
- Founded: 1981
- Services: Certification of Personal Protective Equipment Products
- Website: seinet.org

The Safety Equipment Institute (SEI) is a private, non-profit organization established to administer non-governmental, third-party certification programs to test and certify a broad range of safety and protective products. As of April 2016, it became an affiliate of ASTM International, a global standards development organization. It is accredited to ISO/IEC 17065, Conformity Assessment - Requirements for bodies certifying products, processes and services, by the ANSI National Accreditation Board (ANAB). It works with assorted standards organizations to verify that various products meet the safety standards set for them. Products certified by SEI may bear the SEI Certification Mark.

== See also ==
- American National Standards Institute (ANSI)
- International Organization for Standardization (ISO)
- ASTM International
