= International Accreditation Forum =

International organization providing accreditations

- Abbreviation: IAF
- Merged into: Global Accreditation Cooperation Incorporated
- Formation: April 1993; 33 years ago
- Defunct: January 1, 2026
- Type: Association of accreditation bodies
- Purpose: Facilitate global recognition of accredited conformity assessment
- Headquarters: Chelsea, Québec, Canada
- Region served: Worldwide
- Members: Accreditation bodies and stakeholder organizations from ~90 economies
- Chair: Emanuele Riva
- Main organ: General Assembly
- Website: iaf.nu

The International Accreditation Forum (IAF) was an international association of conformity assessment accreditation bodies and other bodies interested in conformity assessment in fields like management systems, products, services, personnel, processes, and validation and verification.

The IAF's primary function was to develop a worldwide program of conformity assessment which reduces risk for businesses and their customers by assuring them that accredited certificates and validation and verification statements may be relied upon.

IAF accreditation body members have accredited certification or validation and verification bodies that issue certificates or statements attesting that an organization is complying with a specified standard.

On January 1, 2026, IAF ceased operation and merged with ILAC into Global Accreditation Cooperation Incorporated.

== History ==
The International Accreditation Forum (IAF) was established in April 1993 in Geneva, Switzerland, during a meeting of accreditation bodies responsible for quality system certification programs and related activities. Its primary objective at inception was to develop a unified approach to accreditation and to facilitate mutual recognition among national accreditation systems.

In January 1998, the IAF introduced the Multilateral Recognition Arrangement (MLA) for quality management systems (QMS). Fourteen accreditation bodies signed the first MLA in Guangzhou, China, which allowed certificates issued by accredited certification bodies in one country to be recognized in other member countries without the need for re-certification.

The organization's scope expanded over time. In October 2004, during the IAF General Assembly in Cape Town, South Africa, members signed an MLA for environmental management systems (EMS), adding ISO 14001 certification to the list of mutually recognized programs.

Throughout the 2000s and 2010s, IAF continued to extend the MLA to cover additional standards, including those for product certification, validation and verification, and greenhouse gas emission statements. By 2019, IAF membership had grown to include accreditation bodies and stakeholder organizations from approximately 90 economies worldwide.

IAF and ILAC decided to merge into one global accreditation organization, Global Accreditation Cooperation Incorporated, a decision that was first taken in joint meetings in 2019 and confirmed in 2025. Both IAF and ILAC ceased operations on 01 January 2026.

== Role ==
The primary purpose of IAF is two-fold. Firstly, to ensure that its accreditation body members only accredit bodies that are competent to do the work they undertake and are not subject to conflicts of interest.

The second purpose of the IAF is to maintain a mutual recognition arrangement, known as the IAF Multilateral Recognition Arrangement (MLA), between its accreditation body members. This reduces risks to business and customers by ensuring that an accredited certificate may be relied upon anywhere in the world. The MLA eliminating the need for suppliers to be certified in each country where they sell their products or services.

The work of ILAC and IAF is strongly aligned to key projects of UNIDO and UNECE, which promote the adoption of accreditation to facilitate trade, provide employment opportunities, and to facilitate exports and foreign direct investment. The relationship between UNIDO, the IAF and ILAC aims to enhance the impact of industrial development on economic growth and achieving the SDGs.

== IAF CertSearch ==
IAF launched IAF CertSearch so accredited management systems certifications from around the world can be validated. IAF CertSearch is a global database where users can search and validate the status of accredited certification issued by a certification body which has been accredited by an IAF signatory member accreditation body. IAF CertSearch also provides organisations with information about the accredited network, which includes a list of all accreditation bodies and certification bodies across the globe.

== Structure ==
The highest level of authority in IAF are General Meeting Members. General Meetings make decisions and lay down policy in the name of the members. The Board is responsible for legal actions to be carried out on behalf of the members, for developing broad policy directions for IAF and for ensuring that the day-to-day work of the IAF is carried out in accordance with policies approved by members.

== World Accreditation Day ==
The IAF and ILAC, the global associations for accreditation, established World Accreditation Day to take place each year on June 9 to act as a springboard for awareness-raising actions and to promote accreditation to governments, the public and private sectors, and, more generally, citizens. It also provides national organisations the opportunity to organize activities related to the theme of the day.

== See also ==
- IAF MLA
