= Email sender accreditation =

Third-party email sender verification

Sender accreditation is a third-party process of verifying email senders and requiring them to adhere to certain accredited usage guidelines. In exchange, senders are added to a trusted listing that Internet service providers (ISPs) reference to allow certain emails to bypass email filters.

== Overview ==
In reaction to abuse such as spam and phishing, ISPs enabled a block list feature to allow users to block specific email senders. Most ISPs also partnered with spam filtering companies to improve email acceptance, handling, and delivery decisions.

=== Accreditation Lists ===
Accreditation lists improve the accuracy and relevance of email acceptance, handling, and delivery decisions. These lists are intended to ensure email delivery from legitimate bulk and commercial email senders, and prevent them from being erroneously blocked as spam.

== See also ==
- Certified email
- Authenticated Email
- Anti-spam techniques (email)
- email filtering
