= Joint Accreditation System of Australia and New Zealand =

- Logo and mark of the Joint Accreditation System of Australia and New Zealand (JAS-ANZ)
- Abbreviation: JASANZ
- Formation: 30 October 1991 (35 years ago)
- Type: International organization
- Purpose: Certification mark
- Headquarters: Canberra and Wellington
- Region served: Primarily Australia and New Zealand
- Members: Australia and New Zealand
- Chief Executive Officer: Alan Cook
- Website: www.jasanz.org

Joint Accreditation System of Australia and New Zealand (JASANZ) is an independent, third party accreditation body that provides internationally recognised accreditation services.

JASANZ was established by International treaty titled Agreement between Australia and New Zealand concerning the Establishment of the Council of the Joint Accreditation System of Australia and New Zealand (JASANZ) signed in Canberra on 30 October 1991, to strengthen the trading relationship between the two countries and with other countries.

Accreditation is used in the market chain to indicate that certifiers and inspectors are independent and perform their duties according to established standards.

JASANZ accredits the bodies that certify or inspect organisations, products or people. They do so by developing the assessment criteria certifiers and inspectors must meet to become accredited under these themes:

- Business and Innovation
- Environment and Sustainability
- Food and Biological Systems
- Health and Human Services
- Product Certification

JASANZ offers accreditation for the following programs:

- Management systems certification such as quality management systems (AS/NZS ISO 9001), environmental management systems (AS/NZS ISO 14001) and others
- Product certification such as Codemark, Watermark and others
- Personnel certification
- Inspection
- Validation and verification

JASANZ has accredited over 130 conformity assessment bodies (as of 2021) who have certified over 140,000 organisations in over 100 countries.

JASANZ is a member of the International Accreditation Forum (IAF), the International Laboratory Accreditation Cooperation (ILAC) and the Asia Pacific Accreditation Cooperation (APAC).
