= Half time (electronics) =

Time it takes for a pulse to drop to 50% of its peak amplitude

$t_{half}\;=\;t_2\;-\;t_1\,\!$

In signal processing, the half time is the time it takes for the amplitude of a pulse to drop from 100% to 50% of its peak value.
