= Mutual recognition =

Optional foreign relation between two countries harmonious in some way

Mutual recognition occurs when two or more countries or other institutions recognize one another's decisions or policies, for example in the field of conformity assessment, professional qualifications or in relation to criminal matters. A mutual recognition agreement (MRA) is an international agreement by which two or more countries agree to recognize one another's conformity assessments, decisions or results (for example certifications or test results). A mutual recognition arrangement is an international arrangement based on such an agreement.

Countries involved in the agreement can designate for the scope of the agreement Conformity Assessment Bodies (CAB), laboratories and inspection bodies.

MRAs have become increasingly common since the formation of the World Trade Organization in 1995. They have been forged within and among various trade blocs, including APEC and the European Union.

MRAs are most commonly applied to goods, such as various quality control MRAs. However, the term is also applied to agreements on the recognition of professional qualifications and decisions relating to criminal matters.

Accreditation Bodies, under the International Accreditation Forum, use the term Multilateral Recognition Agreements in a similar sense.

== The principle of mutual recognition in European Criminal Law ==
Mutual recognition is a cornerstone principle in the Area of freedom, security and justice (AFSJ) in the European Union (EU). The importance of mutual recognition as a key principle for promoting cooperation, coordination and trust among EU Member States within the AFSJ has been firstly recognized in the Tampere Conclusions, adopted by the European Council in October 1999.

In the AFSJ, the principle of mutual recognition entails that a decision of one Member State is recognized by and obtains legal force in another Member State based on a presumption of mutual trust. Member States trust the fact that within the Union all Member States comply with EU law and particularly with the fundamental rights recognised by EU law. The importance of the principles of mutual recognition and mutual trust was highlighted by the European Court of Justice in its Opinion 2/13. In this Opinion, the Court specified that the presumption of mutual trust prevents a Member State from checking if another Member State comply with fundamental rights guaranteed by EU law, unless exceptional circumstances arise.

Mutual recognition can represent an alternative to harmonisation in order to achieve the goal of European Integration in the AFSJ. Many European criminal law instruments, such as the European Arrest Warrant, have been adopted on the basis of the principle of mutual recognition. However, as stated in Article 82(2) TFEU, the EU legislator can also opt for the adoption of minimum harmonised rules 'to the extent necessary to facilitate mutual recognition of judgments and judicial decisions and police and judicial cooperation in criminal matters having a cross-border dimension'. On that note, a package of directives (the so called 'ABC Directives'), which included for instance the Directive on the right to have access to a lawyer in criminal proceedings, has been adopted using the legal basis of Art. 82(2) TFEU. The aim was twofold: guaranteeing an effective minimum standard of protection of fundamental procedural rights and enhancing mutual trust between Member States thus facilitating mutual recognition.

== See also ==
- Testing, inspection and certification
- Harmonisation of law
- Home state regulation
