= List of Claremont Graduate University people =

These are lists of persons (students, alumni, faculty or academic affiliates) associated with the Claremont Graduate University in California, United States. With over 23,000 alumni, people listed here are CGU distinguished alumni award recipients, distinguished alumni service award recipients, and members of the alumni hall of fame, among others.

== Notable faculty and staff ==
=== Humanities ===
- Douglass Adair - American historian and historiographer
- Richard Armour - poet and author who wrote over 65 books
- John Lemmon - logician and philosopher
- Leonard Levy - Andrew W. Mellon All-Claremont Professor of Humanities and Chairman of the Graduate Faculty of History
- Michael S. Roth - Arts & Humanities; historian, author, curator; 16th president of Wesleyan University; 8th president of California College of the Arts

=== Social sciences ===
- Alfred Balitzer - professor of government
- Eric Helland - professor at Claremont McKenna College and CGU; Senior Economist, Institute for Civil Justice, RAND Corporation
- Alan Heslop - academic and government consultant
- Charles R. Kesler - professor of government/political science at Claremont McKenna College and CGU; editor of the Claremont Review of Books
- Jacek Kugler - world politics scholar, past President of International Studies Association, and Peace Science Society
- Hilton Root - academic and policy specialist in international political economy and development
- Michael Uhlmann - assistant attorney general in the Gerald Ford administration as well as special assistant to the President during Ronald Reagan’s first term in office
- Paul J. Zak - center for Neuroeconomics Studies

=== Behavioral and organizational sciences ===
- Dale Berger - cognitive psychologist and research methodologist
- William Crano - fellow of the American Psychological Association and Association for Psychological Science
- Mihaly Csikszentmihalyi - psychology professor who is noted for work in the study of happiness, creativity, and as the architect of the notion of "flow"
- Stewart Donaldson - distinguished university professor known for his work on evaluation science and positive organizational psychology
- Michael Hogg - social psychologist
- Kathy Pezdek - cognitive psychologist specializing in the study of eyewitness memory
- Michael Scriven - past president of the American Educational Research Association and the American Evaluation Association
- Allan Wicker - recognized for contributions to ecological psychology and the attitude-behavior relationship

=== Business and management ===
- Peter Drucker - widely influential thinker and writer on management theory and practice; self-described "social ecologist"
- Ira Jackson - dean of Peter F. Drucker and Masatoshi Ito Graduate School of Management
- Roger Johnson - businessman and government official
- Jean Lipman-Blumen - professor of public policy and professor of organizational behavior
- Ikujiro Nonaka - influential on business thinking, known for his study of knowledge management

=== Mathematics and information ===
- Paul Gray - School of Information Systems and Technology (emeritus)
- William J. LeVeque - mathematician and administrator; executive director of the American Mathematical Society

=== Health and sciences ===
- Sherwin Carlquist - botanist and photographer
- Robert Folger Thorne - botanist

=== Arts ===
- Peter Boyer - composer, conductor, and professor of music
- Roger Edward Kuntz - landscape painter; member of the Claremont Group of painters
- Suzanne Muchnic - art critic, journalist, writer
- David Pagel - art critic

=== Religion ===
- Richard Bushman - visiting professor in Mormon studies
- Ingolf Ulrich Dalferth - philosopher of religion and theologian
- Jane Dempsey Douglass - feminist theologian and ecclesiastical historian; president of the World Alliance of Reformed Churches
- John Hick - philosopher of religion and theologian
- Jack Miles - author; winner of the Pulitzer Prize and the MacArthur Fellowship
- Dewi Zephaniah Phillips - philosopher of religion
- Rosemary Radford Ruether - feminist scholar and theologian
- Deepak Shimkhada - adjunct professor, Board of Visitors of School of Religion

== Notable alumni ==
=== Government, politics, and international organizations ===
- Michael Anton (MA) - lecturer and research fellow at Hillsdale College, senior fellow at the Claremont Institute, and former deputy assistant to the president for Strategic Communications on the United States National Security Council
- Stephen Cambone (PhD 1982) - first U.S. Under Secretary of Defense for Intelligence
- Tom Cotton (master's degree program) - United States Senator and Congressman from Arkansas
- David Dreier (MA, 1976) - Republican member of the U.S. House of Representatives 1981–2013; Chairman of the House Rules Committee 1999–2007 and 2011–2013
- Jonathan D. Farrar (MA) - chief of mission of the United States Interests Section in Havana, Cuba
- Kenneth J. Hagan (PhD, 1970) - naval historian
- Steven F. Hayward (MA/PhD) - author, political commentator, AEI policy scholar
- Teresa Patterson Hughes (PhD, 1973) - professor of education at California State University, Los Angeles; California State Assembly member (1975–1992); California state senator (1993–2000)
- Susan M. Leeson (PhD, 1971) - associate justice of the Oregon Supreme Court
- Ronald F. Lehman (PhD, 1975) - director of the Center for Global Security Research, Lawrence Livermore National Laboratory; director of the U.S. Arms Control and Disarmament Agency; Assistant Secretary of Defense for International Security Policy; Department of State's U.S. Chief Negotiator on (START I); and Deputy Assistant to the President for National Security Affairs
- Mary Parker Lewis (MA) - political consultant
- Philippe Maystadt (MA, 1973) - former Belgian Minister for Economic Affairs, Minister of Finance, and Deputy Prime Minister as well as current President of European Investment Bank, Luxembourg, Belgium
- Paul O'Neill (MA, 1961) - United States Secretary of the Treasury; chairman of the RAND Corporation
- Susan Orr (PhD, 1992) - head of the Office of Population Affairs and United States Children's Bureau
- Verne Orr (PhD, 2005) - 14th Secretary of the Air Force
- Robert R. Reilly (MA, 1978) - former director, Voice of America
- Peter W. Schramm (PhD, 1981) - professor of political science; executive director of the Ashbrook Center for Public Affairs
- Jack Scott (PhD, 1970) - California state senator; chancellor, California Community Colleges
- Kermit Staggers (PhD, 1986) - professor of history, University of Sioux Falls; South Dakota senator and Sioux Falls city councilman
- Srettha Thavisin (MBA) - 30th prime minister of the Kingdom of Thailand
- Michael Uhlmann (PhD, 1978) - visiting professor of government in the department of politics and policy at Claremont Graduate University and Claremont McKenna College; assistant attorney general in the Gerald Ford administration; special assistant to President Ronald Reagan
- Jerry Voorhis (MA) - Democratic US Representative from California
- Diane Watson (PhD, 1988) - Democratic member of the U.S. House of Representatives 2001–2011
- Abdulla Yameen - president of the Maldives, elected in 2013

=== Academia and science ===
- William Barclay Allen (MA, 1968; PhD, 1972) - political scientist at Michigan State University
- Joyce Appleby (PhD, 1966) - historian at UCLA; President of the Organization of American Historians and the American Historical Association
- Larry P. Arnn (MA, 1976; PhD, 1985) - educator and writer; 12th and current president of Hillsdale College
- José Aybar (PhD, 1978) - president of Richard J. Daley College
- Sacvan Bercovitch (PhD, 1965) - Americanist, literary and cultural critic; Powell M. Cabot Research Professor at Harvard University; visiting faculty member at the School of Criticism and Theory at Dartmouth College
- Elizabeth Castelli (MA, 1986; PhD, 1987) - professor of religion, Barnard College
- Angelo Codevilla (PhD, 1973) - professor emeritus of International Relations at the Pardee School of Global Studies, Boston University
- Nicholas Cummings (MA) - psychologist and former president of the American Psychological Association
- Jack Cuzick (PhD, 1974) - John Snow Professor of Epidemiology at the Wolfson Institute, Queen Mary University of London
- Stewart Donaldson (PhD, 1991) - distinguished university professor known for his work on evaluation science and positive organizational psychology; executive director of the Claremont Evaluation Center and the Evaluators' Institute (TEI), and past president of the American Evaluation Association
- Jacqueline Powers Doud (PhD, 1976) - president of Mount St. Mary's College
- John C. Eastman (PhD,) - politician; former professor and dean at Chapman University School of Law; staff member at the Claremont Institute; former law clerk to Clarence Thomas; attorney for Donald Trump during his attempts to overturn the 2020 United States presidential election
- Irene Eber (PhD, 1966) - sinologist and historian, Louis Frieberg Professor of East Asian Studies at the Hebrew University of Jerusalem
- David H. French (MA, 1940) - anthropologist and linguist
- Arthur Janov (PhD,) - psychologist, psychotherapist, and the creator of primal therapy
- Robert Erwin Johnson (PhD, 1956) - professor of history and considered "one of the finest scholars of the nineteenth century U.S. Navy and U.S. Coast Guard"
- David Keirsey (PhD, 1967) - psychologist
- Robert E. Kennedy (PhD) - president of California Polytechnic State University
- Christopher Manfredi (PhD, 1987) - dean of the Faculty of Arts and Professor of Political Science at McGill University in Montreal
- Warren Montag (MA, 1981; PhD, 1989) - Brown Family Professor in Literature and English, Occidental College
- Milton C. Moreland (MA/PhD) - archaeologist and president of Centre College
- Vincent Phillip Muñoz (PhD, 2001) - associate professor, Political Science, University of Notre Dame
- Franklin Patterson (PhD, 1955) - first president of Hampshire College in Amherst, Massachusetts
- Tomas J. Philipson (MA, 1985) - Daniel Levin Chair in Public Policy at the University of Chicago
- Kathleen Ross (PhD) - founding president of Heritage University
- Jem Spectar (MA/PhD) - president of the University of Pittsburgh at Johnstown
- Laurence Thompson (MA, 1947) - USC professor of East Asian/Taiwanese languages and cultures
- William Van Cleave (MA, 1965/PhD, 1967) - advisor to President Ronald Reagan, Department of Defense, and Department of State; founder of the program of Defense and Strategic Studies at University of Southern California and Missouri State University
- Eileen Wilson-Oyelaran (PhD, 1977) - president of Kalamazoo College
- Donald Yacovone (PhD, 1984) - historian and research manager at Harvard University's W.E.B. Du Bois Institute, and an associate at the Hutchins Center for African and African American Research at Harvard University

=== Business and industry ===
- Min-Shun "Diana" Chen (MBA, 1997) - chairperson/CEO, Taipei World Financial Center (Taipei 101)
- Rajiv Dutta (MBA, 1982) - president of Skype and PayPal
- Nabeel Gareeb (MS) - former CEO of MEMC Electronic Materials, Inc.; sixth highest paid CEO in 2007 (with a salary of $79.6 million)
- Sandy Lerner (MA, 1977) - co-founder, Cisco Systems; founder, Urban Decay Cosmetics

=== Fine arts ===
- Lisa Adams (MFA, 1980) - painter
- Bas Jan Ader (MA, 1967) - Dutch conceptual artist, filmmaker, performance artist, and photographer
- Lewis Baltz (MA, 1971) - visual artist; professor for Photography at the European Graduate School in Saas-Fee, Switzerland
- Bennett Bean (MA, 1966) - ceramic artist
- Karl Benjamin (MA, 1960) - painter of vibrant geometric abstractions
- Greg Colson (MFA, 1980) - artist best known for wall sculptures constructed of salvaged materials
- Kim Dingle (MFA, 1990) - contemporary artist working in paint, sculpture and installation
- John Frame (MFA, 1980) - sculptor, photographer, composer and filmmaker
- William Hemmerdinger (MFA, 1975/PhD,) - artist, writer, gallery owner, educator
- Ferne Jacobs (MFA) - fiber artist and basket-maker
- Adele Y. Schonbrun (MFA, 1965) - ceramic artist
- David Scott (MFA) - museum director
- James Strombotne (MA, 1959) - painter
- James Turrell (MA, 1973) - installation artist primarily concerned with light and space
- Claire Van Vliet (MA) - fine artist, illustrator and typographer

=== Literature and performing arts ===
- Luis Aguilar-Monsalve (MA) - author and professor
- Ashleigh Brilliant (MA, 1958) - author and syndicated cartoonist
- Ian Fowles (MA, 2008) - musician and author
- Daniel Lewis (MA, 1951) - orchestral conductor and pedagogue; professor emeritus at University of Southern California
- Suzanne Muchnic (MFA, 1963) - art critic and art writer for the Los Angeles Times; lecturer on art history and criticism at CGU and University of Southern California
- Edith Pattou (MA, 1979) - author
- Rachel Pollack (MA) - science fiction author; comic book writer; expert on divinatory tarot
- Benjamin Saltman (PhD, 1967) - poet, professor of verse writing and contemporary American literature
- Michael Shermer (PhD, 1991) - founding publisher of Skeptic magazine; monthly columnist for Scientific American; author of Why Darwin Matters, The Science of Good and Evil, and Why People Believe Weird Things
- Cornelius Cole Smith, Jr. (MA/PhD) - author, military historian and illustrator
- Steven D. Strauss (MPP) - author, columnist, and lawyer

=== Religion ===
- Bhikkhu Bodhi (PhD, 1972) (civilian name Jeffrey Block) - Buddhist monk, translator of important works in the Pāli Canon, president and editor of Buddhist Publication Society, chairman of the Yin Sun Foundation, chairperson of Buddhist Global Relief
- Craig A. Evans (MA/PhD) - theologian, Acadia Divinity College
- David Ray Griffin (PhD, 1970) - professor of philosophy of religion and theology
- Marvin Meyer (PhD, 1979) - Griset Professor of Bible and Christian studies, Chapman University
- George F. Regas (PhD, 1972) - rector emeritus, All Saints Episcopal Church, Pasadena, California
- Deepak Shimkhada - adjunct professor, Board of Visitors of School of Religion

=== Others ===
- Bomani Jones (MA, 2006) - sports writer and commentator for ESPN Radio's The Right Time
- Carol Baker Tharp (PhD, 2003) - general manager and former executive director
- John G. West (PhD, 1992) - senior fellow at the Seattle-based Discovery Institute; associate director and vice president for Public Policy and Legal Affairs of its Center for Science and Culture
