= Salience (language) =

Property of being noticeable or important

Salience is the state or condition of being prominent. The Oxford English Dictionary defines salience as "most noticeable or important." The concept is discussed in communication, semiotics, linguistics, sociology, psychology, and political science. It has been studied with respect to interpersonal communication, persuasion, politics, and its influence on mass media.

== Semiotics ==
In semiotics (the study of signs or symbolism), salience refers to the relative importance or prominence of a part of a sign. The salience of a particular sign when considered in the context of others helps an individual to quickly rank large amounts of information by importance and thus give attention to that which is the most important. This process keeps an individual from being overwhelmed with information overload.

=== Discussion ===
Meaning can be described as the "system of mental representations of an object or phenomenon, its properties and associations with other objects and/or phenomena. In the consciousness of an individual, meaning is reflected in the form of sensory information, images and concepts." It is denotative or connotative, but the sign system for transmitting meanings can be uncertain in its operation or conditions may disrupt the communication and prevent accurate meanings from being decoded.

Further, meaning is socially constructed and dynamic as the culture evolves. Each has their own frame of reference, which leads to divergence of sensibilities and true richness in diversity. So the salience of data will be determined by both situational and emotional elements in a combination relatively unique to each individual. For example, a person with an interest in botany may allocate greater salience to visual data involving plants, and a person trained as an architect may scan buildings to identify features of interest. A person's world view or Weltanschauung may predispose salience to data matching those views. Because people live for many years, responses become conventional. At a group or community level, the conventional levels of significance or salience are slowly embedded in the sign systems and culture, and they cannot arbitrarily be changed. For example, the first thing seen in a poster may be the title or picture of a face.

== Communication studies ==
The noun "salience" derives from the Latin word saliens - ‘leaping, or bounding’. In a human embryo, the heart tissue is beating and leaping. A Native American may pay no attention to Columbus Day protests until after instruction in tribal and historical Indian traditions (priming). After gaining new cultural insights, these protests may become "salient."

Salience, as a component of Communication and Social Psychology studies, asks the question of why something captures and holds our attention and why it is more readily available as a cognition than other facts, feelings, and emotions? When a person perceives and reacts, they use the information and emotions most readily accessible. This information is understood to be the most salient information.

Social Influence is an area of intense study for Social Psychologists and Communication theorists. Social Influence asks how and why, are people influenced to weaken a strongly held position, adopt a new position, change an attitude, or persuade someone? The extent that the communicator can understand and harness the power of Social Influence is the extent that they can succeed in their goal.

Salience has been identified as one of the key ideas that guides our understanding of how to make a point of view stand out from among others and draw the receivers attention to the salient points of the encoded message. Salience is then an important concept in several theories relating to Social Influence. Some areas of Communication and Social Psychology research that include the concept of salience as a component of their theory are: Persuasion Theory, Vested Interest, Summation Theory of Attitude Change, Group Salience, and Social Presence Theory. The use of salience in these theories is summarized below:

Persuasion theory: Salience is the critical concept, along with agenda and spin, for the Persuasion theory of Professor Richard E. Vatz of Towson University as articulated in his book, /The Only Authentic Book of Persuasion/, (Kendall Hunt, 2012, 2013). Salience, in his book and articles, is used as a measure of how reality is created for chosen audiences. He claims (1973) (2013) that the struggle for salience (and agenda and meaning and spin) is the sine qua non of the persuasive process.

Vested interest (communication theory): William Crano's states that, "Vested Interest refers to the extent to which an attitude object is hedonically relevant for the attitude holder" (Crano, 1995, p. 131). In order for someone to have a vested interest in something, it must be perceived to affect their lives personally. Things that in which we are highly vested also bear on our behavior (Crano, 1995), and it must be salient or leap out. Vivid cues are more likely to grab our attention (McArthur & Post, 1977). If an attitude object is salient to us, our vested interest will be increased as well as the likelihood that our behavior and attitudes will be consistent (Sears & Citrin, 1985).

Crano states, "Apparently, making an attitude object more salient enhances the salience of attitude-relevant outcomes as well. Vividness, priming, and similar operations may all enhance the salience of the self-interest implications of a position." (Crano, 1995, p. 131). The stronger the salience of our attitude, the stronger will be the connection between our attitude object and our behavior.

Attitude Summation Theory: Fishbein posited that we have many beliefs about an attitude object (characteristics, attributes, values, etc.). Each belief held is argued to have an affective (feeling) and evaluative (value determining) component. An attitude is then a mediated evaluative response (Fishbein, 1963). These attitudes sum together to form our overall view of the attitude object and comes to the forefront (made salient) when we engage the attitude object.

Fishbein indicates that we can hold six to nine salient beliefs at a time (Cronen, 1973). Those manifested during the attitude object encounter determine the prevailing attitude. Fishbein believed that the strongest held beliefs would be the most salient and come to the fore. Cronen argued that salience is not intrinsically tied to strength, but is an independent attribute of attitude change, as some strongly held beliefs are non-salient (Cronen, 1973).

Group Salience: Group salience is a person's cognizance of fellow group members similarities and differences within a group interaction (Harwood et al., 2006). Within a group, communication is the primary way that we determine salience of attitudes. Other things such as physical attributes can be observed, but deeper feelings will have to be communicated within the group to make them salient (Harwood et al., 2006). Coupland et al., suggest that communication processes represent an individual's identity within the group (Coupland et al., 1991).

Social presence theory (SPT): SPT can be defined as, "The degree to which a person is perceived to be a real person in mediated communication." (Gunwadena, 1995) This is an update on the original definition, developed by Short, Williams and Christie (1976), which stated, "The degree of salience of the other person in an interaction."

What makes something salient? How does the mind select, structure and impart meaning to stimuli? People "develop and stabilize" cognitions about stimuli by an "examination of action, intention, ability and environment." (Taylor & Fiske, 1978, citing Heider, 1934, as their source, p. 250). Individuals have limited cognitive resources and abilities to process and comprehend information and situational complexity. A person cannot grasp every nuance of a stimuli required to assign its full and complete meaning. Salience is the way researchers understand what information will most likely capture one's attention in a given situation and have the greatest influence on one's cognitions about the stimuli. Research has shown that the most salient information is not always the most accurate or important, but a "Top of the Head Phenomenon" (Taylor & Fiske, 1978). People are not fully conscious of the extent to which salience affects them. In experimental studies, individuals generated strong cognitions with only slight manipulation of stimuli. When shown this fact, the participant reacted strongly to the idea that they made choices based on "trivial" information (Taylor & Fiske, 1978).

"Salience has generally been treated as a propriety [conforming to standard norms of morality and behavior] of a stimulus which allows it to stand out and be noticed" (Guido, 1998, p. 114). Guido developed the Theory of Dichotic Salience after a review of some 1,200 studies, which pointed to a "common origin among salience instances, by emphasizing the nature of prominence which is intrinsic to any salience construct" (Guido, 1998, Abstract, p. 114). According to this theory, a stimulus is "in-salient" if it is not in harmony with perceiver's worldview. It is "re-salient" if it is in harmony with the perceiver's goals (Guido, 1998).

Salience is a construct that depends on the ability of the mind to access the feelings or emotions (affect) generated by the salient stimulus. The activation in memory of cognitions that relate to and evaluate the stimulus. And finally, the availability of these mental resources to engage the stimulus (Guido, 1998).

A schema (psychology) is a cognitive framework or concept through which one organizes and interprets information. Schemas provide shortcuts in sorting and interpreting the enormous quantity of information generated in one's environment. The limitation of such a construct, is that it may cause one to exclude pertinent facts and feelings about a situation. Instead one may focus on only those that harmonize with one's biases, beliefs and ideations.

Schemas are very useful as they help one to decide about things with very little information. This simplification filters how one allocates cognitive resources. It also allows one to learn more readily and rapidly, if the learning fits within an already established schema. A schema allows for quick access to stored cognitions and filtering through pre-established algorithms, which saves time in processing and retrieving information. Because they are so useful and reliable in helping one make sense of the world, schemas can be hard to change. Thomas Kuhn (1962), in his book, The Structure of Scientific Revolutions, talks about how scientists, considered the most rationale and fact driven professionals, can be so committed to their schemas that they ignore or misinterpret relevant data gathered from experiments that is contrary to their notions. One challenge for communicators is to find a way to break through these hardened perceptions in order to persuade. Making an idea salient is one of the keys.

Guido's Principle one is figure-ground, which is the means the perceptual field from which people direct their attention towards something that stands out. Figurality is the brightness, complexity, and energy (movement) of a stimulus. It is thought that these aspects trigger cognitions and thought processes in the brain that lead to salience. Brightness includes the magnitude and the colors of the object. Studies have shown that bright, vibrant colors more easily capture the attention and are easier to remember (Guido, 1998).

Complexity builds upon the contextual factors (the number of perceptible qualities about the stimulus object that one can distinguish) and learning (what we perceive as unfamiliar). Complexity is the interaction of the familiarity, unfamiliarity, and the number of aspects of the stimulus object that we can resolve. Complexity is the interaction of these stimuli interact to engage affect and cognitions developed about the object (Guido, 1998). Movement of an object engages sensory receptors, which when sparked, send stimuli to the body and brain. Moving pictures, signs and eyes are used to capture our attention and make us pay attention (Guido, 1998).

Novelty is the "isolation" of the stimulus from other stimuli (objects). This isolation or uniqueness sets it apart from other objects in the background, so that it can be noticed (Guido, 1998). This can also be expressed as comparative distinctiveness (Higgins, 1996). Guido's Principle two is Unusuality, which can be broken down into statistical novelty (unique and unfamiliar), unexpectancy, out of role behaviors, negativity and extremity (emotional impact). Novelty is the degree that one has no experience with the stimuli. Unexpectancy is a result of learning. We have developed an expectation that is violated (Guido, 1998). Negativity is our gut reaction. Extremity is the emotional impact of the Negativity. Each of these contributes to making something salient.

Accessibility and Salience. When we evaluate a situation, what comes first to our minds? The things that come to mind are those that are most accessible (most readily recalled and those that are most salient (Kreech and Crutchfield, 1948). Our beliefs and thoughts vary in salience. Salient beliefs are most easily activated in the cognitive processes and are more easily recalled, and are therefore more accessible (Higgins, 1996).

Salience is determined by stimuli, such as brightness, contract, situational properties, schemas, expectations, arousal, and properties of the interpreter (e.g., need state, enduring beliefs, and motivations). The interconnectedness of these stimuli causes the brain to be activated and information salient to the situation recalled and acted upon.

Information stored in memory, that is accessible, can be recalled either by a cue or free association. Information that is not accessible, cannot be recalled and therefore is not available for use in interpreting a situation. Higgins (1996) defines a memory's activation potential as having three properties: 1. the possibility that the knowledge can be recalled (not repressed or lost), 2. how easily accessible is it, and 3.the intensity or the energy of the memory. To the extent that memories are available, accessible, and have sufficient effect is the extent that these memories will be activated and that knowledge is brought to bear on the situation at hand.

Cramer (1968, p. 82) defines priming as "a change in antecedent conditions which is specifically designed to increase the probability of a particular response given to a particular stimulus". The process of priming can activate a particular memory to bring it to the fore so that it can be engaged in a communication or social influence situation. Priming has been shown to increase accessibility of relevant knowledge (Higgins, 1996). Priming is, then, any event that causes increased accessibility and availability of a framework of knowledge (schema) useful for that particular situation.

In journalism, priming is associated with framing. When an author writes an article to persuade, he or she frames certain information so that it is more salient to the reader (Weaver, 2007). Framing including writing decisions about definitions of words and events, causal linkages, moral implications, and solution sets for the problem area (McCombs, 1997). Our minds sort information available using our agenda (framing) and stimulus (priming) for that situation and activate it to accomplish our purpose.

When one encounters a stimulus for the first time, the initial reaction is characterized as unconditioned response. An unconditioned response is one that "elicits a national, reflexive response." (Weseley & McEntarffer, 2014, p. 136). Subsequent encounters will elicit a conditioned response has been developed through the learning that occurred with the intervening encounters with the stimulus. This learning is bedrock knowledge on which one draws when responding to a given situation. (Weseley & McEntarffer, 2014). If the first time one ate ice cream the experience was pleasant, the second experience will be informed from the firs. The second experience will generate salient pleasant cognitions, salivation, and other biological responses that will reinforce the pleasant salience of the experience. If on the other hand, the first encounter was negative (disgust, pain or nausea), the second encounter will generate the feeling of pain in the stomach awful memories of the first encounter. which will reinforce the negative salience of the first and second experience.

Another key aspect of whether a particular memory or knowledge will be activated is whether it is applicable to the situation. If it is not applicable, it will not be salient and is unlikely to be activated for that situation. "According to the synapse model…, the process begins with the stimulus, which increases the excitation level of stored knowledge as a function of the features of the match between the attended features of the stimulus and the features of the stored knowledge." (Higgins, 1996, p. 137). The stimulus information creates a pathway to the knowledge, which is then evaluated for a salience match to the stimulus. If there is a match, then the knowledge will be activated.

Our minds and bodies are bombarded by relevant and irrelevant knowledge and experiences every day. We will tune into salient ones (crane the ears to more fully hear enjoyable music) and tune-out non-salient ones (cover our ears from jackhammer noise). There is difference between seeing something and looking at it. In seeing, the capacity of our retina to take in the light energy is engaged and the brain processes that information into an image. When one looks at an object, not only are visual perceptive capacities engaged, but other mental processes for evaluation and ordering of the object are activated (Skinner, 1974).

Humans have gatekeeper mental mechanisms that allow certain information in and keeps others out. This discrimination process can be viewed a defensive mechanism the protects and enhances our life experience. Our processes of making cognitions "also involve contingencies of reinforcement." (Skinner, 1974, p. 117). Skinner implies that reinforcement as "a special kind of stimulus control." (Skinner, 1974, p. 119). Salience can be thought of as a reinforcement mechanism that make certain thoughts, feelings and emotions available, accessible, applicable and actionable within the context of the situation.

Esber and Haselgrove (2011) looked at the use of predictiveness and uncertainty on stimulus salience. They cite the example of a bird watching the water for the presence of fish. Through learning, the bird associates the ripples with the closeness of the fish, but they must be careful of the uncertainty that ripple is not caused by a crocodile. The ripples are very salient, if they are caused by fish suitable for use as food. The likelihood increases that the ripples will catch the attention of the bird and improve its probability of eating the fish, if the ripple cue is a predictor of fish behavior and presence. The predictiveness of ripples reinforces its salience. The Esber–Haselgrove model argues that (1) "stimuli acquire added salience to the degree that they predict motivationally relevant consequences", and (2) "a predictor of multiple reinforcers should have more salience than a predictor of just one." (Esber & Haselgrove, 2011, 2555-25557). So, for example, if ripples predict both the presence of fish and the increased likelihood that the fish can be caught, they will be much more salient to the bird, than if the ripples only predict the presence of the fish, but tell the bird nothing about the probability of making a catch.

Salience is a broad concept in the social sciences, that can cause confusion. Part of the confusion lies in that different researchers use the same term to posit different ideas of what makes a particular stimulus salient. When we encounter an object or idea, we may be draw to it for a variety of reasons. It may be its brightness or intensity, its predictive capacity, or other features such as uniqueness or enormity that catches one's attention.

Once the attention is engaged, our brain will begin to process this information and make assessments and judgements about the encounter. Our minds and bodies will activate useful memories, biological responses and feelings that were generated from prior encounters with the object of similar objects. These memory-evaluative-feeling-biology responses will determine if the object is salient. If it is salient, we will devote more cognitive processing resources to the encounter and it will enhance or protect us in that moment.

=== Axioms of salience ===
Communication scholars have found that a number of different factors have a direct effect on the salience of attitude objects.

==== Direct experience ====
William Crano posits that one's direct experience with an issue or attitude object increases the salience and consequently the potency of that attitude, and the level of consistency between attitude and behavior.

For example: Consider two people: one with emphysema, one without. Both of whom share a negative attitude toward cigarette smoking. The person with emphysema would have a stronger attitude than his counterpart, and consequently would show greater consistency between his relevant attitude and behavior. It is posited by Crano that the attitude toward smoking of the person with emphysema may be more salient due to his direct experience with the consequence of smoking.

==== Self-Interest ====
The concept called vested interest by Crano is called self-interest by Sears (1997). It seems that "self-interest" is the more widely recognized term. Self-interest involves either perceived or actual personal consequences. That is, Crano (1997) argues that vested interest involves perceived personal consequences (p. 490), while Sears (1997, a critique of Crano) counter-argues that Crano's survey experiments define it objectively. Crano argues that vested interest should have a moderating effect on attitudes. Sears argues that, actually, evidence for this is conflicting: The survey literature has rarely found significant effects of self-interest, while the experimental literature finds significant effects. The literature is concerned with salience only marginally; it is actually about strength of attitudes (i.e. how well they correlate with behavior). It is about salience inasmuch as anything "strong" is "salient".

==== Needs and aspirations ====
The salience (prominence) of an attitude can also be measured by the relevance of an idea to that person's needs or aspirations. As ideals become more salient they become more accessible, the more accessible the attitude object is the stronger the attitude toward the object. As accessibility increases, so does the likelihood of self-interested voting (Young).

For example: In times of elections, issue relevant events are the focus of attention. Therefore, candidates, due to their aspiration for a certain political position are interest driven toward the salient events since they are favorable to their party.

=== Policy making ===
Political scientists agree that salience is relatively important in examining political policy, because policies are not only determined by what issues are important to people but also by how important they are. This involves examining what issues are ignored and which are made "important." One research agenda that political scientists are concerned with understanding is "when and how salience and changes in salience matter for political action."

There are three related understandings of salience.

1. The first ("classical") interpretation considers salience to be independent of the "status quo" and politicians’ ideal policies and programs. Although it says salience is independent of ideals, it does not say that salience is independent of preferences. This means, where there is a change in salience there is also a change in preferences. Often a player or policymaker's ideals may not be known but their preferences are usually revealed in their party's manifestos. Often policymakers cannot achieve their ideals but rather must choose between the offers on the table. They may prefer one over the other and this is where salience affects a party or a politician's position on an issue.
2. The second ("valence") interpretation proposes that for certain issues salience is a very important factor. In other words, when there is a general consensus of principles, the relative salience of various issues amongst the public determines the policy position of policy makers. This is due to constraints in policy making, where ideals are often induced, which policy makers view as the tradeoff space. For example, although "ideally" they may like to see low unemployment and low inflation, they are usually constrained to pick a position on the "tradeoff" line. Thus, their ideal has been induced due to constraints. In these situations salience and policy position are almost interchangeable, because their "induced ideal" is their "favored allocation." In the classical interpretation, salience would be used to describe the different levels of preference between positions on policies.
3. The third ("price") interpretation assumes that salience is not separate from ideals, as the classical view states, but that it is also not the same as ideals, as the valence view claims. This interpretation assumes that although a group of players, sharing benevolent preferences, all dissatisfied with the status quo, may still value different aspects differently when considering policy change. The price interpretation is favored over the other two for three reasons. First, it is more applicable. Unlike the classical view, the price interpretation can be applied to a more wide-ranging set of situations. Second, the price interpretation uses both the classical point of view and ideals in its evaluation of salience. Not only do you need to know a player's weighted preferences but also their connection to their ideal point and the status quo. Therefore, a change in salience can reflect a change in ideal point, status quo, or their weighted preferences. Third, this interpretation can be used to determine the elements stand in importance or worth. For example, players may organize and focus their time and energy into options with the biggest pay off. "That is they may look to see where they get the greatest ‘bang for their buck.’"

== Public opinion ==
McCombs and Shaw’s seminal "Chapel Hill study," which researched salience and public opinion examined most of the agenda-setting research since the 1968 United States presidential election which has been concerned with how the public salience of the issue is related to mass media’s ranking of these issues in terms of frequency of coverage and news play. The main hypothesis examined in this study is the ranking of certain issues by the media, which, in time, becomes the public agenda. More importantly, the article searched whether the perceived public salience of the federal budget deficit is significantly related "to the amount of public knowledge about the issue, direction of public opinion regarding one possible solution to the issue, the strength of that opinion and political behavior such as writing letters, signing petitions, voting, etc." The result of this study concluded that "even though the federal deficit issue was one of the more salient to newspaper and voters during the 1988 election, it (the federal budget deficit) was not as emotional or dramatic as some of the other highly salient issues such as drug abuse or environmental pollution. Thus it seemed likely that public opinion regarding a solution to the federal budget deficit might be rather evenly split and would likely be more stable during the month of interviewing than would opinion on some of the other more dramatic issues being emphasized in news media coverage and political advertisements." In other words, issues that directly involve subjects, in this study, would conclude to be more salient than issues that do not involve them directly.

== Marketing stimuli ==
Although salience is a stimulus response, is it a stimulus quality or an absolute quality? Salience plays an important role in intergroup communication. According to Harwood, Raman and Hewstone, "Group salience is a key variable both in influencing quality of intergroup contact and in moderating the effects of intergroup contact on prejudicial attitudes."

In their study of family communication and intergroup relationships, "Group salience is an individual’s awareness of group memberships and respective group differences in an intergroup encounter (e.g., the salience of race in an interracial conversation)." This study carefully examines the dynamics of intergroup relationships with respect to communication in a family context. Their study involved communicative aspects associated with age salience in the grandparent – grandchild relationship, the extent to which various dimension of communication predicts measures of salience, relational or inter-family proximity, and attitudes towards aging. According to Harwood, Raman and Hewstone, "Communication phenomena that were positively correlated with measures of age salience were negatively related to relational closeness. Only one communication measure (grandparents talking about the past) moderated the relationship between quality of contact with grandparent and attitudes toward older people. Specific communicative dimensions emerged that warrant further investigation in this and other intergroup contexts."

Salience also from an applied communicative perspective plays an important role in our Consumer- Marketing world. In Gianluigi Guido's book, The Salience of Marketing Stimuli: an incongruity – salience hypothesis on consumer awareness, "salience triggered by an external physical stimuli, like all marketing stimuli are before being internalized by consumers – to explain and predict the conditions under which a marketing stimulus, is able to achieve its communication outcomes in term of processing and memory." The book clearly defines the history of the definition of salience and the ambiguities of arriving at an accurate definition. It also utilizes various theories to best define salience in our marketing world. Of the many theories, Guido uses aspects of Incongruity theory, Schema theory and an information processing model referred to as the In-salience hypothesis emphasizes the nature of prominence of salience.

Marketing plans have become quite intricate and detailed in many ways. Analysts and industry experts used a myriad of tools to collect information from would be customers, previous customers and others in order to fashion the sales message of a particular product. This level of detailed work has evolved over time, but in many ways the same resources and information are gathered and used to achieve result of a sale. The marketing strategy feeds into one of the final products most people get to experience: the commercial. The commercial embodies the elements of the marketing strategy in language, affective response, and attitude change. Marketing plans in the modern age also look at the international customer when creating plans and formulating strategy. "An evolutionary perspective of internationalization of the firm has been adopted by a number of authors in the areas of international economics and international management. The theory of the international product lifecycle, propounded by Vernon and others, identifies a number of phases in the internationalization process based on the location of production. In the initial phase, a firm exports to overseas markets from a domestic production base. As market potential builds up, overseas production facilities are established. Low cost local competition then enters the market, and ultimately exports to the home market of the initial entrant, thus challenging its international market position."

"This model is part of wider Dichotic theory of salience, according to which a stimulus is salient either when it is incongruent in a certain context to a perceiver's schema, or when it is congruent in a certain context to a perceiver's goal. According to the four propositions of the model, in-salient stimuli are better recalled, affect both attention and interpretation, and are moderated by the degree of perceivers' comprehension (i.e., activation, accessibility, and availability of schemata), and involvement (i.e., personal relevance of the stimuli). Results of two empirical studies on print advertisements show that in-salient ad messages have the strongest impact in triggering ad processing which, in turn, leads to consumer awareness."

The field of marketing is continually being studied and researched. Anshular & Kumar, Williams & Schmidt, Holden, Kuznetsov & Whitelock, and Huang & Chan have researched and published works regarding the language of marketing. Although the research is ongoing and adaptive to the customer, the research has been able to study points of importance to the consumer. Marketing requires an approach that carefully designs messages (commercials), utilizing signs and symbols to resonate with a potential buyer or customer. Nike's swoosh, Michael Jordan's jump-man image, Ford/GMC Cadillac logos are all signs that most people can quickly grab and discern the message being laid out. In the world of marketing having this power and ability lends a significant edge in comparison to the competition. Van Der Lans, Pieters, and Wedel write based on their research:

"We estimate brand salience at the point of purchase, based on perceptual features (color, luminance, edges) and how these are influenced by consumers’ search goals. We show that the salience of brands has a pervasive effect on search performance, and is determined by two key components: The bottom-up component is due to in-store activity and package design. The top-down component is due to out-of-store marketing activities such as advertising."

Using computer based langue to design extraction tools as part of the user experiences. Language errors that exists in projects can be passed on and further create issues for the next group. From this view issues to be fixed, ID’d and solutions set up to combat such issues. In the IT world, coding language is very important and therefore errors must be monitored well throughout the process.

Internet Alcohol Vendors unlike traditional brick and mortar stores are established to reach a wider market. With this intent state officials and competitors have both started cases in court as further regulating the practice of internet alcohol sales. Internet sales give buyers reduced discounts in many forms while offering very little in security and accountability. The case brought against the industry favored further regulation keying in on individuals underage age having access to and buying alcohol online. The courts pushed back against the plaintiff lacking substantial information to make the case. The marketing language used was focused on reduced taxes based on quantity purchased and reduced or zero fees for shipping. Customers were connected to this message and therefore drawn to the product and made significant purchases.

Russian viewpoint of marketing focused on the battle against capitalism, the west and specifically USA. Marketing language focused on the economics of each nation and how to improve it in an ever-changing world. Marketing was studied in the west by Russian students and translated for Russians to understand. Bad language came from translators who took artistic leisure with the material. Based on this context things were changed and missed when information was being relayed created huge shifts in understanding of the original material.

The difference between the English alphabet and Chinese logographical system offer a unique challenge in brand creation, marketing and language. The article touches on how unique messages have to be crafted without simply translating. The Chinese language and system of writing is over 35,000 years old and not as easily bent or flexed to make easily pronounced phrases both in sound and linguistic prowess. Marketing in china is affected my culture and language equally. Crafting an effective strategy requires adherence and understanding of all factors.

Therefore, to define salience as appropriate as possible using the information, it would be apt to define it such that, salience is that intrinsic concept of the perceived or interpreted prominence of an attitude, and its manifestation on our choices.

Salience in marketing based on the research reviewed, can be categorized as a stimulus quality. What that means is the customers’ needs have to be calculated and adjusted towards through the entire planning and execution of the plan. The overall goal of the messenger should be to create a message which adapts to the customer's affective responses, rewarding it with more info, then finally providing a product which would best arrive at the predetermined feel. Most consumers when asked about a marketing campaign are able to identify it clearly from the point of view of a commercial. These commercials capture the essence of the message being sent to all recipients. Products such as make up, cars, clothing, coffee, food, shoes etc. are all designed to create and provide an affective reaction from the recipient. The process of engaging with the customer seeks a cognitive connection. Customers will have to be grouped based on the item in order to predict affective responses. With this in mind, the focus is placed on imagery, affective responses from the consumer. How does this make you feel, do you empathize, how would you feel about using this product, etc. Marketing messages that have a significant affective component are able to connect better with people and yield greater outcome.

Identity salience can affect the consumer. This display can be explain using "Identity theory posits that identities are arranged hierarchically and that salient identities are more likely to affect behavior than those that are less important. We propose that identity salience may play an important role in relationships that are distinguished by a minimum of two characteristics. First, though most theoretical and empirical research in relation-ship marketing focuses on characteristics of successful business-to-business relationships, such as trust and commitment (Morgan and Hunt 1994), many exchange relationships involve individuals. It is not unusual for organizations to attempt to develop long-term relationships with consumers on an individual basis. We argue that in contexts in which one partner is an individual, for example, business-to consumer marketing, identity salience may be an important construct that mediates relationship-inducing factors, such as reciprocity and satisfaction, and relationship marketing success." Identity gets tied to brands, products and places for some people. There are generations of family sports team supporters, airline users, vacation goings and even restaurant patrons. These key items become a foundation block of self-identification and perception.

The vehicle industry uses certain symbols as part of its marketing campaign. Most of these are touched on from different manufacturers in their efforts to win over customers. These are also common messages points that are used to make the sale and acquire the vested interest of the customer. For e.g. comfort (leather seating), roominess (cabin space), reliability, safety, performance, on/off-road handling, award winner by category, insurance companies or other entity. The best part of all the campaign is the dealership experience. This experience is the affective piece of the process. The initial being cognitive and schema connection, followed by the affective which aims at nudging the customer towards affirming the purchase. Customer attitudes can be influenced by a myriad of variables, therefore the marketing campaign is aimed at skewing enough of those variables towards to nearest dealer or once most capable of making the sale. "Specifically, research on behavioral synchrony suggests that people express greater feelings of attraction when they share their visual gazes, body postures (Chartrand & Lakin,2013), and more recently, their language style in writing or speech (Ireland & Pennebaker,2010)."

Salience as a stimulus quality is a significant piece of the marketing, sales and commercial strategy. Manufacturers use celebrities, athletes, and other professionals as a way of drawing your attention to their product through stimulus. When it comes to car buying, many people refer to a past memory, this stimuli is different with each person but overall the quality and richness of that response is what connects to the brand in a way nothing else does. Care makers go through periods of recycling pieces of nostalgia to connect new drivers to those of yesteryear. Granpa is able to drive his mustang next to a grandson who favors the new model with a few modifications. A suit maker is able to dress members of the same family for 3 generations and just as many weddings and formal events.

The stimulus quality is the strongest connection between all these events and the company or product creator able to take advantage of this, is most likely to achieve success. "Research concerning stimulus characteristics, which include information content and format, suggests that consumers utilize more nutrition information when it Is presented in an easily processed form (Levy et al. 1985; Muller 1985; Russo et al. 1986; Scammon 1977).(Moorman, 1990)" Stimulus qualities continually change and therefore needs to be studied and adaptations made in order to attain the best marketing end results. Cultural viewpoints of marketing and advertising is important across industries in many parts of the world. In the US alcohol sales are restricted to individuals ages 21 and greater, that rule isn't universal and some in nations around the world are trying to cope with the effects of marketing and ad campaigns (O’Brian & Carr 2016)." Marketing messages are important based on the roles of the recipient. In the example of a mom she’s expected to judge the quality of goods and purchase based on the needs of children even though the good may not directly be marketed to and for her. "Noting the incongruence between the self-interested, utility maximizing persona one is expected to portray in the workforce, and the selfless, nurturing persona widespread among mothers, Hays argues that the latter identity in fact reveals a deep-seated cultural ambivalence towards economistic principles and behaviours."

le form schema based on social norms and roles. These roles are enforced individual beliefs and boosts perceptions is supposed to be doing, sometimes those expectations hold true and in others it doesn't. Social identity theory has been used while creating marketing strategies regarding women. Marketing strategies with products aimed at women should have like minds as part of the planning and creative process. Women across cultures and backgrounds experience similar stimuli but not on the same wave. Products like shoes, makeup, clothing and others geared specifically for women have messages focused on stimuli response of "feel good". Moms receive and are sent messages of safety and security of their children, a measure of style and the look and presentation of a strong woman. Marketing towards men are designed to inspire the feel of strength, leadership, vision, connection to nature, and feeling of ruggedness.

The Language used in marketing is important because it is potentially the most important reason why someone makes a purchase/acquires a product. Research has shown that analytics aren't always the best predictor of sales or consumer connection with a product. Social identity theory can be used to evaluate the roles of individuals while creating the strategy. Depending on this solely will lead one astray without the addition of other pieces of information. Shema allows the consumer to receive each detail of a commercial/ad campaign in a way that energizes particular stimuli and therefore puts each person into the "driver seat" of an experience.

The cognitive perspective spells out information which must be received, processed and analyzed and solutions south. Salience in marketing searches for the affective or stimulus response. A combination of efforts which both harvests information and processes it carefully if very important. Things such as age group, buying power, shopping frequency, socioeconomic status are all important. Once a product is created and during its testing phase the response which users and customers alike will be its feel. In the new age of tech data, appliances and complex machinery, marketing will still need to focus its efforts on such products and how consumer stimuli reacts to the product. The best engineers can create something that's amazing with all its bells and whistles, but its up to the perception of the customer to evaluate its usefulness and fit into his/her lifestyle.

The growing tech industry with the power of achievement is quickly advancing virtual reality. VR can be experienced in the home without leaving to try or test any product prior to purchase. "The mural isn't just about aesthetics. Visitors will be instructed via signs to download an app to view the mural's augmented reality features. Downloading the app will also unlock a special coupon at The Elephant Room. It's a marketing tactic that Moody believes can drive foot traffic to the bar." With this power marketing analysts and executives can craft messages and commercial aimed at each person with a unique and authentic feel. Information and data points are being collected and tested now. Video games offer a chance into the virtual world medical training and some groups in government and the military are adopting the technology to better achieve results. Crafting the message and spreading it out the masses will take less effort in the future, messages can be adapted to fit all manner of permutations each person may have. There may finally be an era of error free messaging with a direct link into the internet, show rooms of fashion designers, engineers at car factories and all other sorts of products. Testing in the virtual world would be far less tasking on legions of people.

Humans in general respond greatly to stimuli and we offer this through the reactions generated. Marketing lends help in this manner by studying the patterns of behavior and crafting products for sale. The messaging is not always clear, succinct, and wide reaching. Research is still ongoing regarding how best to reach the customer in order to pitch and complete a sale. Those who are successful have crafted tools to help measure key things like salience in messaging and reaction to products. In the new age, the data collected will be very important while outfitting each member of the consuming public. Being able to craft a message or medium that can quickly adapt to each person virtually is of great importance. Online markets are gaining followership daily as more money spending moves to the digital realm. Perception and reception of the message is still the single most important part of any marketing strategy and should not be treated lightly.
