= Doud =

People with the surname Doud:

- Chuck Doud, video game music composer
- Mamie Eisenhower, whose maiden name was Doud
- Jacqueline Powers Doud, president of Mount St. Mary's College
- Reuben G. Doud, American politician
- Ruby Archer Doud, American poet

== See also ==
- Douds (disambiguation)
