= Vested interest =

Vested interest or Vested interests may refer to:

- Vested interest (communication theory), a communication theory that seeks to explain how influences affect behavior
- Vesting, a term used in law and finance to describe a right to possess an asset, in the present or at some point in the future
