= Michael Quinn Patton =

American sociologist

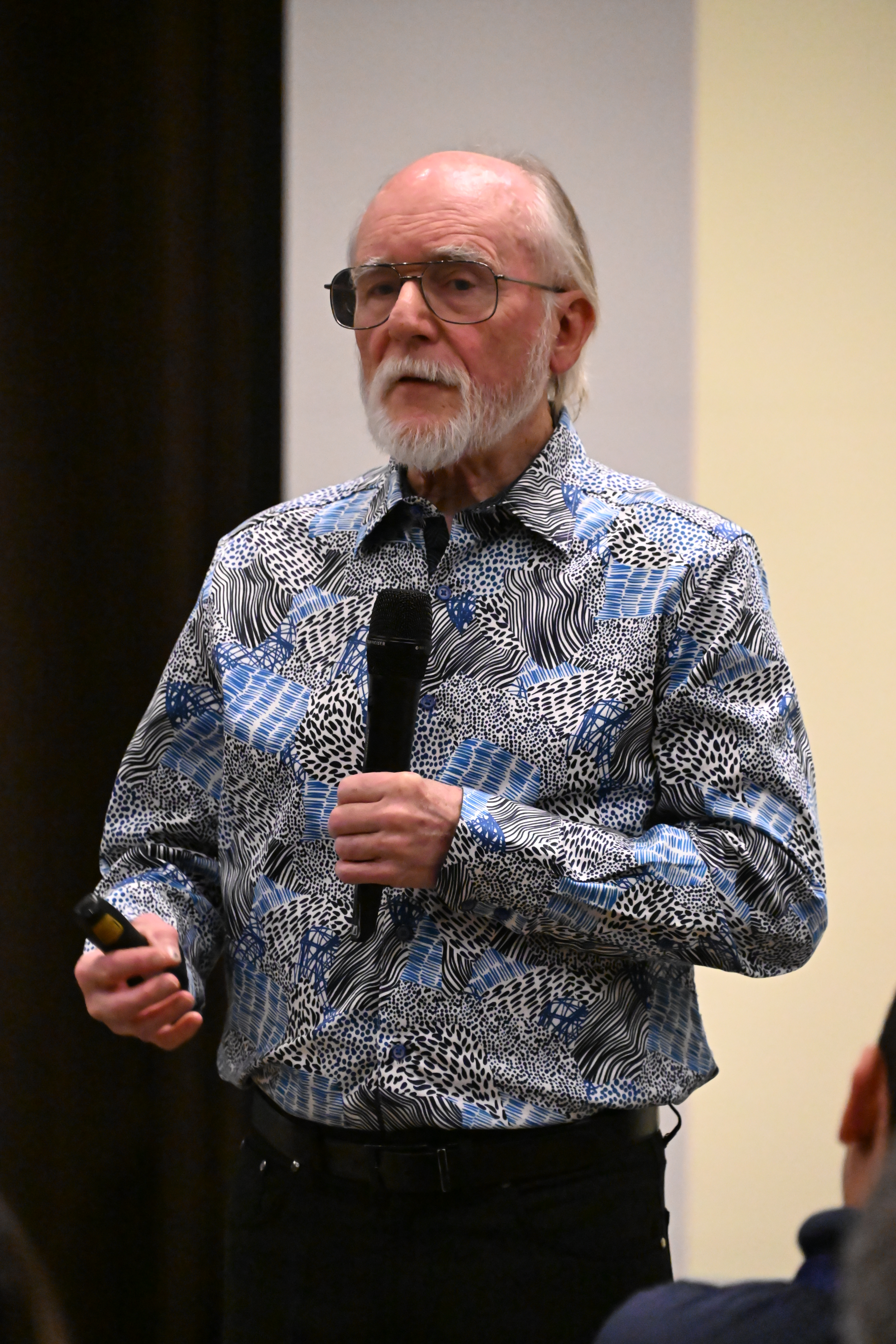
- Born: September 05, 1945; Pewee Valley, Kentucky
- Occupation: Founding figure in 20th-century program evaluation. Creator of Utilization-Focused evaluation.
- Known for: program evaluation, qualitative research

Michael Quinn Patton (born 1945) is an independent organizational development and program evaluation consultant, and former president of the American Evaluation Association. He is the founder and director of Utilization-Focused Evaluation.

After receiving his doctorate in sociology from the University of Wisconsin–Madison, he spent 18 years on the faculty of the University of Minnesota (1973–1991), including five years as Director of the Minnesota Center for Social Research and ten years with the Minnesota Extension Service.

Patton has written many books on the art and science of program evaluation, including Utilization-Focused Evaluation (4th ed., 2008), in which he emphasizes the importance of designing evaluations to ensure their usefulness, rather than simply creating long reports that may never get read or never result in any practical changes. He has written about evaluation, and worked in the field beginning in the 1970s when evaluation in the non-profit sector was a relatively new development.

In "Developmental Evaluation: Applying Complexity Concepts to Enhance Innovation and Use," Patton makes a convincing case that evaluation can also be useful when there is not a fixed model being improved (as in formative evaluation) or tested (as in summative evaluation). In cases where there is not yet a clear model, or where the environment is too complex and changing too fast for the model of practice ever to be fixed, developmental evaluators can be of great assistance by helping people articulate their hunches and hopes, do "vision-directed reality testing," tracking emergent and changing realities, and "feeding back meaningful findings in real time so that reality testing facilitates and supports the dynamics of innovation." (p. 7) This type of evaluation is particularly helpful in the context of social innovation, where "goals are emergent and changing rather than predetermined and fixed, time periods are fluid and forward-looking rather than artificially imposed by external deadlines, and the purposes are innovation, change, and learning rather than external accountability (summative evaluation) or getting ready for external accountability (formative evaluation)." (p. viii). Instead of evaluating a program to determine whether resources are being spent on what they're supposed to be spent on, developmental evaluation helps answer questions like, "Are we walking the talk? Are we being true to our vision? Are we dealing with reality? Are we connecting the dots between here-and-now reality and our vision? And how do we know? What are we observing that's different, that's emerging?" (p. 13).

== Bibliography ==
- Practical Evaluation. (Sage, 1982. ISBN 0-8039-1905-0)
- Culture and Evaluation. (Jossey-Bass, 1985. ISBN 0-87589-763-0)
- Creative Evaluation. (Sage, 1987. ISBN 0-8039-3056-9)
- How to Use Qualitative Methods in Evaluation. (Sage, 1987.)
- Family Sexual Abuse: Frontline Research and Evaluation. (Sage, 1991.)
- Grand Canyon Celebration: A Father-Son Journey of Discovery. (Prometheus, 1999.)
- Essentials of Utilization-Focused Evaluation. (Sage, 2012.)
- Teaching Evaluation Using the Case Method: New Directions for Evaluation. (2005, with Patricia Patrizi.)
- Getting to Maybe: How the World is Changed. (Random House Canada, 2006, with Frances Westley and Brenda Zimmerman.)
- Developmental Evaluation: Applying Complexity Concepts to Enhance Innovation and Use. (Guilford Press, 2011. ISBN 978-1-60623-872-1)
- Qualitative Research and Evaluation Methods. (4th edition: Sage, 2015. ISBN 978-1412972123)
- Developmental Evaluation Exemplars: Principles Into Practice (Guilford, 2015: co-editor)
- Utilization-Focused Evaluation checklist: https://www.wmich.edu/sites/default/files/attachments/u350/2014/UFE_checklist_2013.pdf
- Pedagogy of Evaluation: New Directions for Evaluation (Wiley, 2017: editor)
- Principles-Focused Evaluation: The GUIDE (Guilford, 2018.)
- Facilitating Evaluation: Principles in Practice (Sage, 2018.)
- Blue Marble Evaluation: Premises and Principles (Guilford, 2020)
- Utilization-Focused Evaluation. (5th edition: Sage, 2021. 4th edition: Sage, 2008)

== Awards and honors ==
- Alva and Gunnar Myrdal Award (awarded by the Evaluation Research Society and subsequently by the (American Evaluation Association) for "outstanding contributions to evaluation use and practice"
- Paul F. Lazarsfeld Award for lifetime contributions to evaluation theory (awarded by the American Evaluation Association).
- 2001 Lester F. Ward Award for Outstanding Contributions to Applied Sociology (presented by the Society for Applied Sociology).
- 2017 Research On Evaluation Award (American Evaluation Association)

Patton was president of the American Evaluation Association in 1988 and co-chair of the 2005 International Evaluation Conference in Toronto sponsored jointly by the American and Canadian evaluation associations. He sits on the Editorial Advisory Board for The Foundation Review.
