= Tharp =

Tharp is a surname, and may refer to:

== In literature and theater ==
- Kenneth Tharp (contemporary), English dance artist
- Twyla Tharp (b. 1941), American dancer and choreographer

== In music ==
- Aran Tharp (b. 1977), American avant-garde musician
- Reynold Tharp (b. 1973), American composer
- Stephen Tharp (b. 1970), American organist

== In politics and law ==
- John J. Tharp, Jr. (b. 1960), US District Judge in Illinois
- William Tharp (1803–1865), American politician from Delaware; governor of Delaware 1847–51

== In sports ==
- Ja'Kobe Tharp (born 2005), American hurdling athlete
- Taylor Tharp (b. 1984), American professional football player

== In business ==
- Carol Baker Tharp (1952–2007), American executive director

== Other ==
- Hale Tharp (1828–unknown), miner during the California Gold Rush
- Lars Tharp (b. 1954), Danish-born British-based historian, lecturer and broadcaster
- Marie Tharp (1920–2006), American geologist and oceanographer
- Newton J. Tharp (1867–1909), American architect, painter

== See also ==
- Tharpe
- Thorp (disambiguation)
