= Stewart Donaldson =

British psychologist

Stewart I. Donaldson
- Occupation: Distinguished university professor
- Known for: Author and psychologist

Stewart I. Donaldson is a British-born American positive psychologist specializing in health, well-being, and evaluation science. He is a distinguished university professor at Claremont Graduate University and is the director of the Claremont Evaluation Center and The Evaluators' Institute. He also served as dean at Claremont for 16 years (2001-2017) and as president of the American Evaluation Association in 2015.

== Career ==
Donaldson is now a distinguished university professor in the Schools of Social Science, Policy & Evaluation and Community and Global Health at Claremont Graduate University, and he also serves as the executive director of the Claremont Evaluation Center and The Evaluators Institute. In 2015, he served as president of the American Evaluation Association.

== Books ==
Donaldson has published more than 130 peer-reviewed articles and chapters on the science and practice of positive psychology, well-being, positive organizational psychology, program design and evaluation, and has published or has forthcoming more than 20 scholarly books, including Stewart I. Donaldson, Mihaly Csikszentmihalyi, Jeanne Nakamura (2020). Positive Psychological Science: Improving Everyday Life, Well-Being, Work, Education, and Societies Across the Globe | Donaldson, Stewart I.; Picciotto, Robert (2016). Evaluation for an equitable society (ebook ed.). Charlotte, NC: Information Age Publishing, Incorporated. p. 239. ISBN 9781681234458.

== Personal life ==
Donaldson is a naturalized US citizen who has lived in California.

== See also ==
- List of Claremont Graduate University people
