= Tharpe =

Tharpe is a surname that may refer to:

- Sister Rosetta Tharpe (1915–1973) gospel singer and guitarist
- Jimmy G. Tharpe (1930–2008), Baptist clergyman
- Larry Tharpe (born 1970), American football offensive tackle
- Saucerhead Tharpe, a major character in Glen Cook's Garrett P.I. series

== See also ==
- Tharp
