= Douds =

Douds may refer to:

== People ==
- Dennis Douds (born 1941), American football coach
- Forrest Douds (1905–1979), American football player

== Places ==
- Douds, Iowa

== See also ==
- Doud, a surname
