= Dale Berger =

US academic

- Scientific career
- Institutions: Claremont Graduate University

Dale Berger is a professor of Psychology, Emeritus, and former Dean of the School of Behavioral and Organizational Sciences (SBOS), Claremont Graduate University in Claremont, California. Berger is a cognitive psychologist and research methodologist with a focus on the use of technology in support of teaching and learning statistics.

Berger is a Fellow of the American Psychological Society (APS) and the Western Psychological Association (WPA), former President of the Western Psychological Association (2002–2003), and recipient of the 1997 Outstanding Teaching Award from the Western Psychological Association.

== Web Interface for Statistics Education (WISE) ==
Berger's statistics website WISE was selected as a winner of the MERLOT Award for Exemplary Online Learning Resources, which recognizes and promotes outstanding online resources designed to enhance teaching and learning. (1)

WISE consists of a sequence of interactive tutorials on key statistical concepts, including:

- sampling distributions (2)
- the central limit theorem (3)
- hypothesis testing (4)
- statistical power (5)
- correlation and regression analysis (6)
- t-tests (7)

The tutorials use dynamic applets that allow the user to explore relationships on their own. Guided exercises are designed to help the learner to take advantage of the applets to gain a deeper understanding of the concepts and logic that underlie much of inferential statistics.

== Education ==
Berger received his B.S. in mathematics from the University of Minnesota, Minneapolis (Phi Beta Kappa), and his MA and Ph.D. in psychology from the University of California, Los Angeles.

== Bibliography ==
Recent Berger publications include:

- Stevahn, L., Berger, D. E., Tucker, S. A., & Rodell, A. (2021). Using the 2018 AEA Evaluator Competencies for effective program evaluation practice. New Directions for Evaluation, Special Issue: The American Evaluation Association’s Program Evaluator Competencies, 2020(168), pp. 75–97. https://doi.org/10.1002/ev.20434
- Alexander, D. D., Lunde, S. E., & Berger, D. E. (2020). Gastrointestinal tract symptomatology in adults with pica and autism. Autism and Developmental Disorders, 18(4), 3–12. doi:10.17759/autdd.2020180401
- Siegel, J. T., Flores-Medel, E., Martinez, D. A., & Berger, D. E. (2019): Can mental health anti-stigma messages have untoward effects on some people with depression?: An exploratory study. Journal of Health Communication, http://doi.org/10.1080/10810730.2019.1672838
- Alexander, D. D., Lunde, S. E., & Berger, D. E. (2019). Gastrointestinal tract symptomatology in adults with pica and autism. ResearchGate.net/publication/324731935. Reviewed in Autism Research Review International, 3(3), pp. 2, 6.
- Berger, D. E. (2018). Stepwise regression. In B. B. Frey (Ed.), The SAGE Encyclopedia of Educational Research, Measurement, and Evaluation, pp. 1621–1623. https://doi.org/10.4135/9781506326139.n670
- Liu, P., Wood, S., Xi, P., Berger, D., & Wilber, K. (2017). The role of social support in elder financial exploitation using a community sample. Innovation in Aging, 1(1). https://doi.org/10.1093/geroni/igx016
- Fernando, G. A., & Berger, D. E. (2017). The role of religion in youth exposed to disasters in Sri Lanka. Journal of Prevention & Intervention in the Community, 45(4), 238–249. https://doi.org/10.1080/10852352.2016.1197751
- Chi, T-Y, Olfman, L., & Berger, D. E. (2017). Computer skill acquisition: The effects of computer-aided self-explanation on knowledge retention and transfer. Proceedings of the 50th Hawaii International Conference on System Sciences. ISBN 978-0-9981331-0-2, doi:10.24251/HICSS.2017.010. hdl:10125/41160
- Berger, D. E. (2016). Book Reviews. [Review of the book Cognitive planning and executive functions: Applications in management and education. New Delhi: SAGE Publications, 2015.] The Journal of Entrepreneurship, 25, 103–105. doi:10.1177/0971355715616506
- Pentoney, C. S., & Berger, D. E. (2016). Confidence intervals and the within-the-bar bias. The American Statistician, 70(2), 215–220. Posted online 18 Feb 2016. https://doi.org/10.1080/00031305.2016.1141706
- Huang. Y. H., Wood, S, Berger, D. H., & Hanoch, Y. (2015). Age differences in experiential and deliberative processes in unambiguous and ambiguous decision making, Psychology and Aging, 30(3), 675–687. https://doi.org/10.1037/pag0000038
- Toma, M., Halpern, D. F., & Berger, D. E. (2014). Cognitive abilities of elite nationally ranked SCRABBLE and crossword experts. Applied Cognitive Psychology, Published online in Wiley Online Library (wileyonlinelibrary.com) doi: https://doi.org/10.1002/acp.3059
- Basáñez, T., Blanco, L., Collazo, J. L., Berger, D. E., & Crano, W. D. (2013). Ethnic groups' perception of physicians' attentiveness: Implications for health and obesity. Psychology, Health & Medicine, 18(1), 37–46.
- Huang. Y. H., Wood, S, Berger, D. E., & Hanoch, Y. (2013). Risky choice in younger versus older adults: Context matters. Judgment of Decision Making, 8(2), 179–187.
- Lac, A., & Berger, D. (2013). Development and validation of the Alcohol Myopia Scale. Psychological Assessment, 25(3), 738-747.
- Lac, A., Crano, W. D., Berger, D. E., & Alvaro, E. M. (2013). Attachment theory and theory of planned behavior: An integrative model predicting underage drinking. Developmental Psychology, 49(8), 1579–1590.
- Shaked-Schroer, N., Costanzo, M., & Berger, D. E. (2013). Overlooking coerciveness: The impact of interrogation techniques and guilt corroboration on jurors’ judgments of coerciveness. Legal and Criminological Psychology. doi:10.1111/lcrp.12011
- Sosa, G., Berger, D. E., Saw, A. T., & Mary, J. C. (2011). Effectiveness of computer-assisted instruction in statistics: A meta-analysis. Review of Educational Research, 81, 97–128.
- Fernando, G.A., Miller, K.E., & Berger, D.E. (2010). Growing Pains: The impact of disaster-related and daily stressors on the psychological and psychosocial functioning of youth in Sri Lanka. Child Development, 81(4), 1191–1209.
- Miller, K.E., Fernando, G.A., & Berger, D. (2009). Daily stressors in the lives of Sri Lankan youth: A mixed methods approach to assessment in a context of war and natural disaster. Intervention: International Journal of Mental Health, Psychosocial Work and Counseling in Areas of Armed Conflict, 7(3), 187–203.
- Vinson, K. V., Costanzo, M., A., & Berger, D. E. (2008). Predictors of verdict and punitive damages in high-stakes civil litigation. Behavioral Sciences and the Law, 26, 167–186.
- Malek, M. H., Berger, D. E., Marelich, W. D., & Coburn, J. W. (2008). On the application of meta-analysis in pectus excavatum research. American Journal of Cardiology, 101(3), 415–417.
- Malek, M. H., Berger, D. E., & Coburn, J. W. (2007). On the inappropriateness of stepwise regression analysis for model building and testing. European Journal of Applied Physiology, 101, 263–264.
- Fiorentino, D. D., Berger, D. E., & Ramirez, J. R. (2007). Drinking and driving among high-risk young Mexican-American men. Accident Analysis & Prevention, 39, 16–21.
- Berger, D. E. (2006). Preparing for a Rewarding Career Applying the Science of Psychology. Also Donaldson, S. I., & Berger, D. E. (2006). The Rise and Promise of Applied Psychology in the 21st Century. Chapters in Donaldson, S. I., Berger, D. E., & Pezdek, K. (Eds.) Applied psychology: New frontiers and rewarding careers. Mahwah, NJ: Lawrence Erlbaum Associates.
- Malek, M. H., Berger, D. E., Housh, T. J., Marelich, W. D., Coburn, J. W., & Beck, T. W. (2006). Cardiovascular function following surgical repair of pectus excavatum: A meta-analysis. Chest, 130, 506–516. Abstract published in Medicine & Science in Sports & Exercise, 38(5) Supplement, 2006.
- Malek, M. H., Berger, D. E., Marelich, W. D., Coburn, J. W., Beck, T. W., & Housh. T. J. (2006). Pulmonary function following surgical repair of pectus excavatum: A meta-analysis. European Journal of Cardio-Thoracic Surgery, 30, 637–643.
- Weekes, N., Lewis, R., Falgooni, P., Garrison-Jakel, J., Berger, D. E., & Lupien, S. J. (2006). Examination stress as an ecological inducer of cortisol and psychological responses to stress in undergraduate students. Stress, 9(4), 199–206.
