= Hilton Root =

American academic

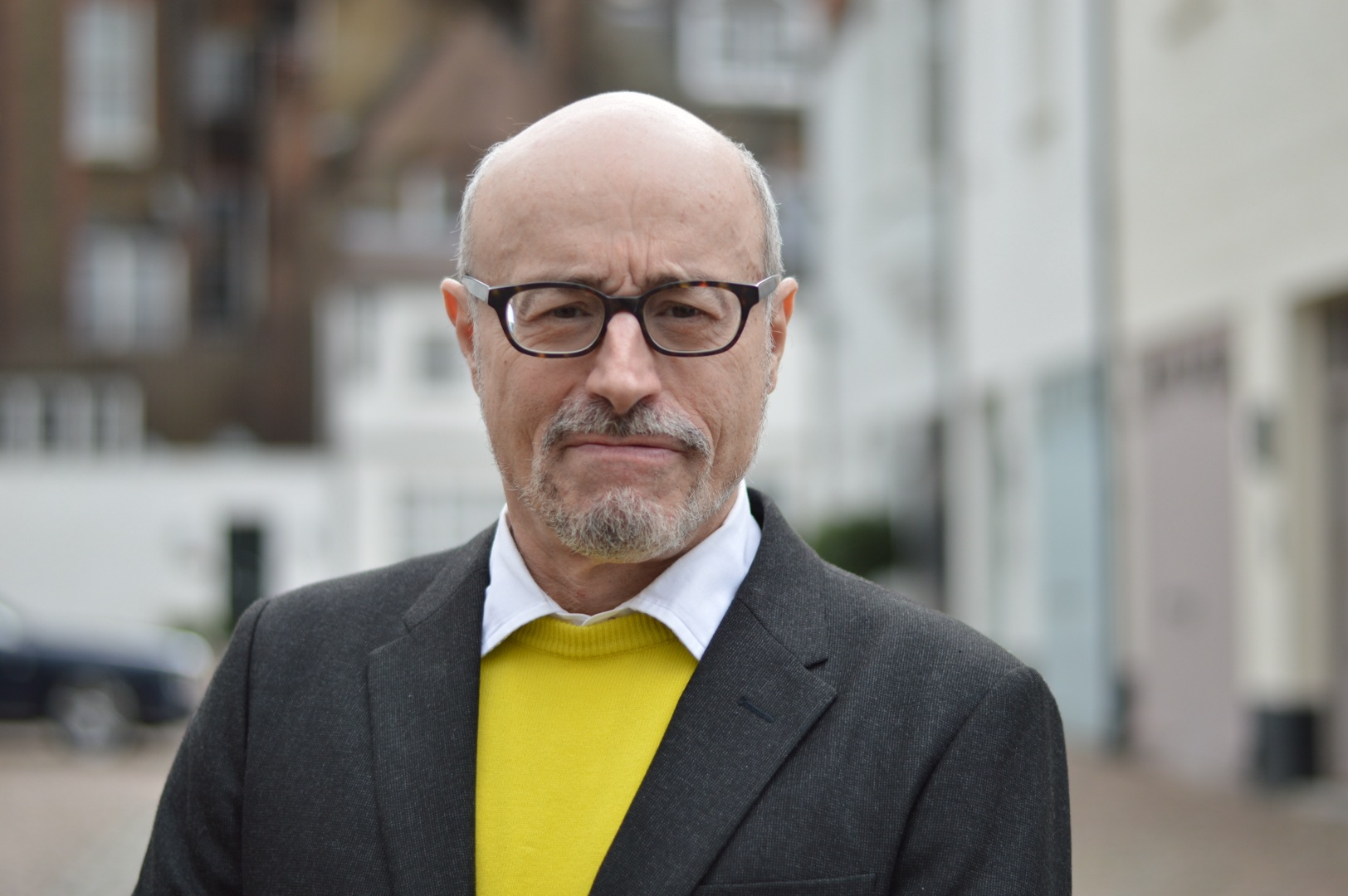

Academic background
- Education: University of Michigan

Academic work
- Discipline: Political economy
- Institutions: Schar School of Policy and Government of George Mason University
- Website: https://schar.gmu.edu/profiles/hroot2

Hilton Root is an American academic. He is a professor of public policy at the Schar School of Policy and Government of George Mason University, in Virginia. He specializes in international political economy and international development.

His published work includes Dynamics among Nations: The Evolution of Legitimacy and Development in Modern States, which was published by the MIT Press in 2013.

== Education ==
- Mellon Post-Doctoral Program in Social Sciences, California Institute of Technology
- Ph.D., University of Michigan
- Diplôme d’Etudes Avancées, Politics & Law, Université de Bourgone, Dijon, France
- M.A., University of Michigan
- B.A., State University of New York at Buffalo
