= James Strombotne =

American painter

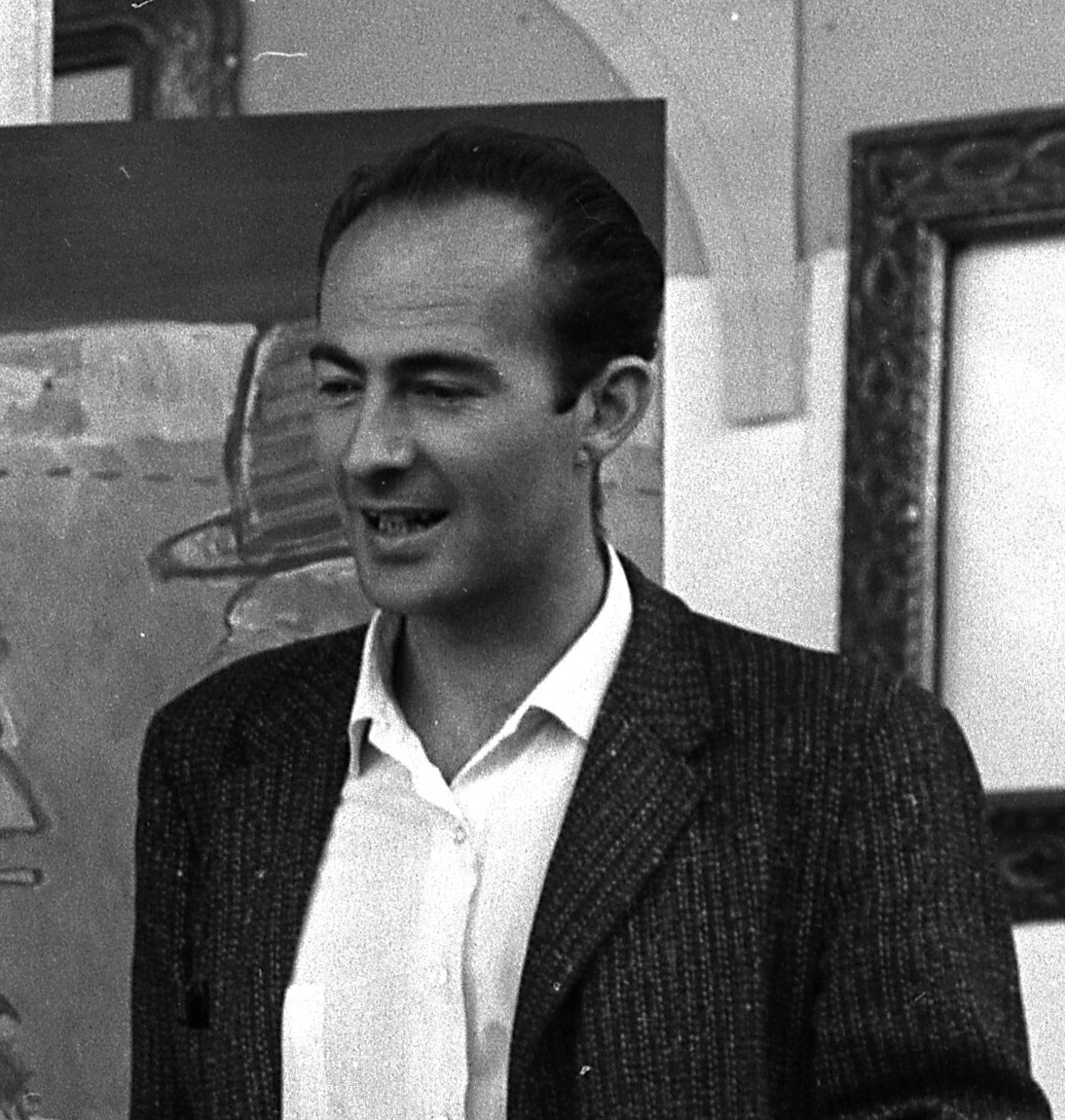
James Strombotne in 1961

James S. Strombotne (born 1934) is an American painter. He is known for his figurative work.

== Early life and education ==
Strombotne was born in Watertown, South Dakota, but was raised and educated in Southern California, receiving his Bachelor of Arts from Pomona College in 1956 and his Master of Fine Arts from the Claremont Graduate School in 1959. He received a fellowship from Pomona College to study in Italy, and in 1962 was awarded a Guggenheim Fellowship for further study in Rome. The same year, a feature article about his work appeared in Time Magazine.

== Career ==
Strombotne's first one-man show was at the Studio 44 gallery in San Francisco in 1956. Since then, he has had over seventy five one-man shows, with twelve retrospectives: four in New York City, twenty-two in Los Angeles, and others in San Francisco, Washington D.C., Santa Barbara, Santa Fe, Newport Beach (CA), and other venues. His work has also been included in most major group shows in America, including two Whitney Biennials, the Carnegie International and the Corcoran Biennial.

Strombotne's paintings can be found in the permanent collections of museums across the United States, including the Museum of Modern Art in New York, the Whitney Museum of American Art, The Hirshhorn Museum, the San Francisco Museum of Modern Art, the Los Angeles County Museum of Art, and the Art Institute of Chicago. His work is also included in many well-known private collections, most notably the Jack Nicholson collection, which includes twenty of Strombotne's major pieces.

Strombotne taught at the University of California, Riverside for 40 years, retiring in 2005. He continues to paint every day in his Orange County, California studio.

== Recognition ==
Awards he has received include the Art in America "New Talent Award," and an appointment to the Institute of Creative Arts at the University of California in 1965–66.
