= William Hemmerdinger =

William Hemmerdinger is an American artist, gallery owner, critic, and educator. For most of his artistic career he lived and worked in Los Angeles. He now teaches at the Boston Architectural college.

== Education ==
Hemmerdinger earned an Associate of Arts degree at College of the Desert. He received his Bachelor of Arts in 1973 from the University of California, Riverside, where he studied art, architecture, art history, and Asian languages. In 1975, Hemmerdinger earned his MFA from Claremont Graduate School. He returned to Claremont to complete his PhD in philosophy with an emphasis on aesthetics.

== Career ==
Hemmerdinger was a member of the California Watercolor Society from 1971 to 1996. He studied Asian brush painting under J. Ma Leung and sculpture and design with Hovak Najarian. After graduating from UC Riverside, Hemmerdinger was the recipient of a fellowship at the National Palace Museum in China and a residency at the Myoshinji Monastery in Japan. During his time in Asia he associated with the Fifth Moon Group (Fong Chung-ray and Liu Kuo-sung), Running Rain Group, Hideo Sakata, and Bong Tae Kim.

In addition to his work with watercolors, Hemmerdinger found success with mixed media paintings, sculpture, and printmaking. His works are held by a number of institutions throughout the nation and internationally.

Together with his wife Catherine, William Hemmerdinger opened the William and Catherine Hemmerdinger Gallery in Palm Desert, California. Throughout the 1980s and 1990s, the gallery appraised and exhibited European and American painting, sculpture, prints, and photographs in addition to Native American art and non-western art.

William Hemmerdinger's reviews for exhibitions and galleries in Southern California have been published in Artweek, Art Scene, and Arts Magazine. He has taught at Claremont Graduate School, Pomona College, Otis Art College, and California Institute of the Arts. Hemmerdinger currently teaches Design Media at Boston Architectural College.
