= Carol Baker Tharp =

- Born: May 13, 1952; Charleston, South Carolina
- Died: November 25, 2007 (aged 55); Los Angeles, California
- Occupations: General manager, City of Los Angeles Department of Neighborhood Empowerment

Carol Baker Tharp (May 13, 1952 – November 25, 2007) was an American general manager and former executive director.

== Biography ==
=== Early life ===
Carol Baker Tharp was born in Charleston, South Carolina, and later grew up in Charlotte, North Carolina. In the early 1970s, she received her bachelor's degree from Wake Forest University. In 1986, she and her husband, Michael, moved to Los Angeles, California, settling in Eagle Rock.

=== Managing and directing ===
Tharp earned a Ph.D in public policy and ethics from Claremont Graduate University in 2003. After receiving her PhD, she spent four years at the University of Southern California School of Politics, Planning and Development as the deputy director of the Civic Engagement Initiative. At USC, Carol Baker Tharp managed a project to map neighborhood involvement throughout the region. Before becoming the deputy director of the Civic Engagement Initiative in January 2004, she was the executive director of Coro in Southern California and was Community Relations director for Eugene, Oregon. The third general manager position of the Department of Neighborhood empowerment was filled in for an interim chief for about eleven months when Los Angeles mayor Antonio Villaraigosa offered the position to her.

During her time as Deputy Director at the USC School of Policy, Planning, and Development she worked with associate dean Rich Callahan to develop leadership programs and executive education programs. She also taught an ethics class for undergraduates.

Upon being hired as General Manager for the City of Los Angeles Department of Neighborhood Empowerment, Baker Tharp said that she intended to focus on getting councils to achieve results in their neighborhoods. In a particular matter, she did not want neighborhood council members to overstep their roles.

=== Later years ===
Tharp left the Department of Neighborhood Empowerment in September 2007 due to an aggressive battle with breast cancer. She died at her home on November 25, 2007, at age 55. Los Angeles mayor Antonio Villaraigosa, in mourning her death, stated:

"Carol Baker Tharp loved the City of Los Angeles and spent the past year working to strengthen its neighborhoods as the General Manager of the Department of Neighborhood Empowerment. Through her entire professional career and decades of community involvement as leader of Coro, the acclaimed non-profit civic affairs leadership training institution, and during her service to USC, Carol maintained the belief that civic engagement is the cornerstone of democracy. She committed her life to expanding power of the people. Her integrity, intelligence, compassion and humor will be missed. Though we mourn her passing today, we take comfort in the fact that her work and ideas will continue to yield positive benefits for the people of Los Angeles."
