= Jacqueline Powers Doud =

American academic administrator

Jacqueline Powers Doud is president emerita of Mount St. Mary's College. She served as the college's eleventh, and first lay president from July 2000 until March 2012. Doud also serves on the Board of Visitors of the School of Education of Claremont Graduate University and is a trustee of the Thomas and Dorothy Leavey Foundation.

Doud's tenure has been noted for her promotion of in-depth strategic planning for the college's development. Key goals under her successive strategic plans have been to increase the college's endowment (which has nearly doubled since 2000, to over $65 million) and to continue to reach traditionally underserved communities through higher education (including women, minorities, and first generation students).
