= William Crano =

American psychologist (born 1942)

William Dean Crano (born 1942) is an American psychologist. He is the Oskamp Distinguished Professor of Psychology in the Division of Behavioral and Organizational Sciences (DBOS), Claremont Graduate University.

He has also written almost 200 peer-reviewed journal articles, in journals including Journal of Personality and Social Psychology, Journal of Studies on Alcohol, Psychological Inquiry, Journal of Social Psychology, and AIDS Education and Prevention, and is the co-author of an article in Annual Review of Psychology, Volume 57, 2006. He is a Fellow of the American Psychological Association (APA) and Association for Psychological Science (APS).

== Bibliography ==
- Crano, W. D. (2012). The Rules of Influence: Winning When You're in the Minority St. Martin's Press. ISBN 978-0-312-55229-9
- Ramirez, J.R., Crano, W.D., Quist, R. Burgoon, M., Alvaro, E.M. and Grandpre, J. (2004). "Acculturation, Familism, Parental Monitoring, and Knowledge as Predictors of Marijuana and Inhalant Use in Adolescents." Psychology of Addictive Behaviors. 18(1), pp. 3–11.
- Dawson, E. J., Burgoon, M., & Crano, W. D. (2003). "Parents' and their children's beliefs and knowledge of HIV/AIDS in a multicultural Hispanic/Anglo population." In L. K. Fuller (Ed.), Media-Mediated AIDS (pp. 175–202). Cresskill, NJ: Hampton Press. ISBN 1-57273-264-4
- Crano, W. D. (2003). "Theory driven evaluation and construct validity." In S. Donaldson & M. Scriven (Eds.), Evaluating Social Programs and Problems: Visions for the New Millennium (pp. 145–157). Mahwah, NJ: Lawrence Erlbaum Associates. ISBN 0-8058-4185-7
- Crano, W. D. (2003). "Conformity." In K. Christensen & D. Levinson (Eds.), Encyclopedia of Community: From the Village to the Virtual World (Vol. 1, pp. 327–329). Thousand Oaks, CA: Sage. ISBN 0-7619-2598-8
- Crano, W. D., & Brewer, M. B. (2002). Principles and Methods of Social Research (2nd Ed.). Mahwah, NJ: Lawrence Erlbaum Associates. ISBN 0-8058-3904-6
- Crano, W. D., & Burgoon, M. (2002). Mass Media and Drug Prevention: Classic and Contemporary Theories and Research. Mahwah, NJ: Lawrence Erlbaum Associates. ISBN 0-8058-3478-8
- Crano, W. D. (2001). "Directed Social Influence." In J. P. Forgas, K. D. Williams, & L. Wheeler (Eds.), The Social Mind: Cognitive and Motivational Perspectives on Social Behaviour (pp. 389–405) New York: Cambridge. ISBN 0-521-54125-5
- Crano, W. D. (2001). "Social influence, social identity, and ingroup leniency." In C. K. W. De Dreu and N. K. De Vries (Eds.), Group Consensus and Minority Influence: Implications for Innovation (pp. 122–143). Oxford, UK: Blackwell. ISBN 0-631-21233-7
- Crano, W. D., & Burgoon, M. (2001). "Vested interest theory and AIDS: Self-interest, social influence, and disease prevention." In F. Butera & G. Mugny (Eds.), Social Influence in Social Reality: Promoting Individual and Social Change (pp. 277–289). Seattle, WA: Hogrefe & Huber. ISBN 0-88937-256-X
