= American Evaluation Association =

Nonprofit organization in Washington D.C., United States

The American Evaluation Association (AEA) is a professional association for evaluators and those with a professional interest in the field of evaluation, including practitioners, faculty, students, funders, managers, and government decision-makers. As of 2014, AEA has approximately 7057 members from all 50 US states and over 60 other countries.

== Mission ==
The American Evaluation Association's mission is to:

- Improve evaluation practices and methods
- Increase evaluation use
- Promote evaluation as a profession and
- Support the contribution of evaluation to the generation of theory and knowledge about effective human action.

=== Guiding principles for evaluators ===
AEA Publishes the AEA: Guiding Principles for Evaluators, which set expectations for evaluators in the areas of: (a) systematic inquiry, (b) competence, (c) integrity/honesty, (d) respect for people, and (e) responsibilities for general and public welfare.

=== Publications ===
AEA sponsors two journals. The American Journal of Evaluation is published quarterly through SAGE Publications and includes individually peer-reviewed articles on a range of topics in the field. New Directions for Evaluation is a peer-reviewed thematic sourcebook published quarterly through Jossey-Bass/Wiley, with each issue focusing on a different topic or aspect of evaluation.

=== Topical interest groups ===
As of September 2014, AEA has 50+ topically focused subgroups. Each subgroup develops a strand of content for the association's annual conference, and works to build a community of practice through various means.

- Advocacy and Policy Change
- Arts, Culture, & Museums
- Assessment in Higher Education
- Behavioral Health
- Cluster, Multi-Site, and Multi-Level Evaluation
- Collaborative, Participatory & Empowerment Evaluation
- College Access Programs
- Community Development
- Community Psychology
- Costs, Effectiveness, Benefits, & Economics
- Data Visualization & Reporting
- Democracy & Governance
- Design & Analysis of Experiments
- Disabilities and Underrepresented Populations
- Disaster & Emergency Management Evaluation
- Educational Evaluation
- Environmental Program Evaluation
- Evaluation Managers & Supervisors
- Extension Education Evaluation
- Feminist Issues in Evaluation
- Government Evaluation
- Graduate Education Diversity Internship (GEDI)
- Graduate Student and New Evaluators
- Health Evaluation
- Human Services Evaluation
- Independent Consulting
- Indigenous Peoples in Evaluation
- Integrating Technology into Evaluation
- Internal Evaluation
- International & Cross Cultural Evaluation
- LatinX Responsive Evaluation Discourse
- Leadership and Organizational Performance
- Lesbian, Gay, Bisexual & Transgender Issues
- Mixed Methods Evaluation
- Multiethnic Issues in Evaluation
- Needs Assessment
- NonProfit & Foundations
- Organizational Learning & Evaluation Capacity Building
- Program Design
- Program Theory & Theory-Driven Evaluation
- Qualitative Methods
- Quantitative Methods: Theory & Design
- Research on Evaluation
- Research, Technology & Development Evaluation
- Social Finance
- Social Network Analysis
- Social Work
- STEM Education and Training
- Systems in Evaluation
- Teaching of Evaluation
- Theories of Evaluation
- Translational Research Evaluation
- University-Based Centers
- Use and Influence of Evaluation
- Youth Focused Evaluation

== History ==
=== Merger of ERS and ENet ===
In 1986, the Evaluation Research Society and Evaluation Network merged to become the American Evaluation Association. The two associations had been conducting joint annual conferences for several years when ERS President Joseph Wholey contacted Evaluation Network President Michael Hendricks to suggest a formal merger of the two organizations.
