= Chinese censorship abroad =

The People's Republic of China is widely alleged to engage in censorship, beyond its borders, to both Chinese expatriates and foreign groups. Sensitive topics that have been censored include the political status of Taiwan, human rights in Tibet, Xinjiang re-education camps, the persecution of Uyghurs in China, the 1989 Tiananmen Square protests and massacre, the 2019–2020 Hong Kong protests, the COVID-19 pandemic in mainland China, the Chinese government's COVID-19 pandemic response, the persecution of Falun Gong, and more general issues related to human rights and democracy in China.

Self-censorship is undertaken by foreign companies wishing to do business in mainland China, a growing phenomenon given the country's market size and enormous consumer base. Companies seeking to avoid offending the Chinese regime and Chinese customers have engaged in self-censorship, as well as disciplining of staff that have offended the regime. When pressured by the Chinese regime, some companies have apologized or made statements in support of the regime's policies.

The PRC government pays 50 Cent Party operatives and encourages "Little Pink" nationalist netizens to combat any perceived dissent against its position on Chinese issues, including opposing any foreign expressions of support for protesters or perceived separatist movements, with the country's "Patriotic Education campaign" since the 1990s emphasising the dangers of foreign influence and the country's "century of humiliation" by outside powers.

Censorship of overseas services is also undertaken by companies based in China, such as WeChat and TikTok. Chinese citizens living abroad as well as family residing in China have also been subject to threats to their employment, education, pension, and business opportunities if they engage in expression critical of the Chinese government or its policies. With limited pushback by foreign governments and organisations, these issues have led to growing concern about self-censorship, compelled speech and a chilling effect on free speech in other countries.

== Censored topics ==
The "Three Ts and Two Cs"
Tibet (including human rights in Tibet, the Central Tibetan Administration and the Dalai Lama)

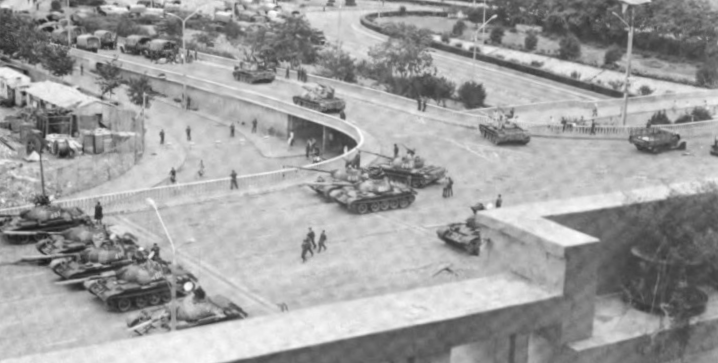
1989 Tiananmen Square protests and massacre

Taiwan (including Taiwan independence movement, One Country on Each Side principle and other challenges to the One China policy)

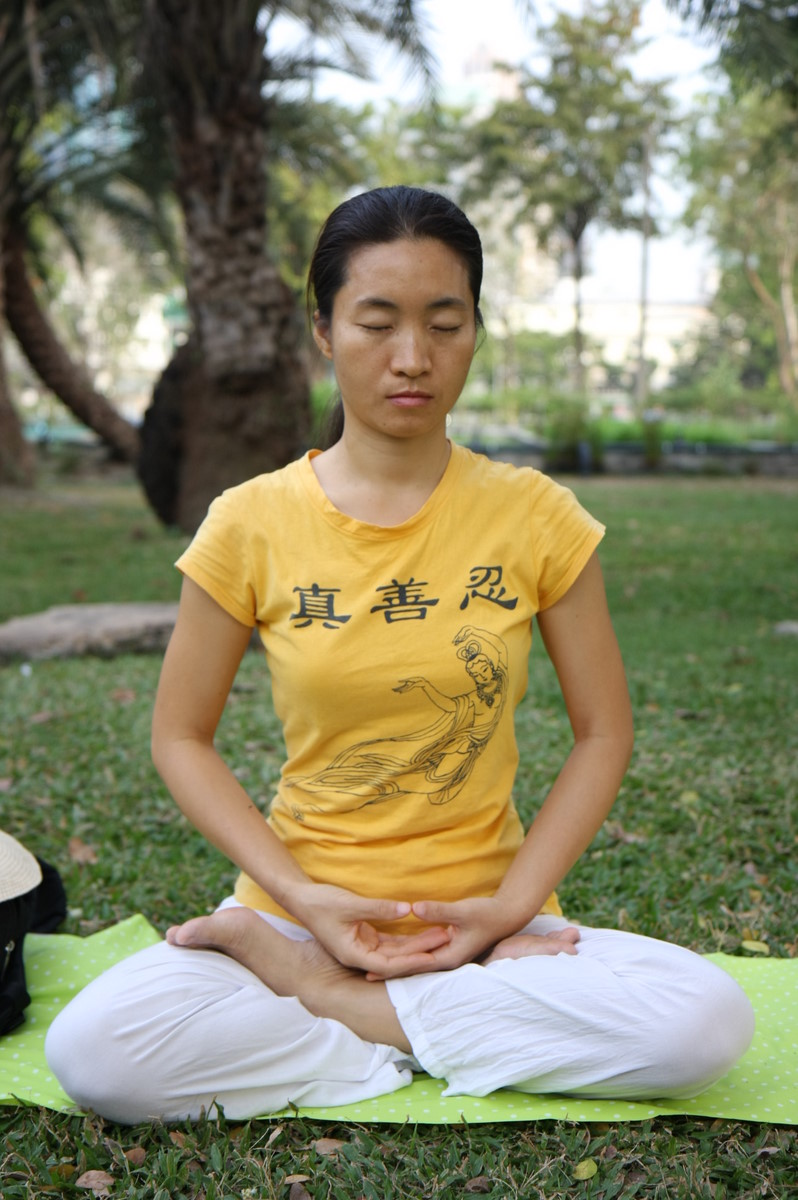
Cult (the CCP's label for Falun Gong)

Criticism of the Chinese Communist Party (including by the democracy movements of China)

Traditionally, foreign companies wishing to do business in China needed to avoid references to "The Three Ts and Two Cs": Tibet, Taiwan, the Tiananmen Square massacre, cult (the CCP's label for Falun Gong), and criticism of the Chinese Communist Party. This included related topics such as the Dalai Lama, who the Chinese government considers a subversive Tibetan "splittist" and opposes any expressions of support from foreign governments or organisations.

In the early 21st century, companies faced potential backlash on a broader range of issues relating to China, such as failing to include Hong Kong, Macau, and Taiwan as part of China on their websites in violation of the One China Policy. Further sensitive topics include: comments about current General Secretary of the Chinese Communist Party Xi Jinping's weight, including comparisons to rotund children's character Winnie the Pooh; the Great Leap Forward and Cultural Revolution, disregard of the Chinese government's nine-dash line in the South China Sea dispute; the re-education camps and other human rights abuses against Uyghurs in Xinjiang; expressions of support for the 2019–2020 Hong Kong protests, and the government's censorship of the COVID-19 pandemic.

== Academia ==
There is growing concern that the Chinese government is trying to silence its critics abroad, particularly in academic settings. Historically, censorship in China was contained within the country's borders, but following the ascension of Xi Jinping to General Secretary of the Chinese Communist Party in 2012, the focus has expanded to silencing dissent and criticism abroad, particularly in academia.

There have been a number of incidents of Chinese students studying abroad in Western universities seeking to censor academics or students who espouse views inconsistent with the official Chinese Communist Party position. This includes intimidation and violence against the University of Auckland and University of Queensland protesters demonstrating in support of Hong Kong and Uyghurs, challenging lecturers whose course materials do not follow the One China Policy by listing Hong Kong and Taiwan as separate countries, and tearing down Lennon Walls in support of the Hong Kong democracy movement.

In 2019, the PRC Consul-General in Brisbane, Xu Jie, faced legal proceedings by Drew Pavlou, a student who had organised a demonstration in support of the 2019–2020 Hong Kong protests. Pavlou alleged that Jie incited death threats by accusing him of "anti-Chinese separatism". The court dismissed the suit on the basis of diplomatic immunity. Pavlou was later suspended for two years by the university over allegations of discriminatory bullying and harassment of university staff and students, which he claimed was intended to silence his criticism of the university's close links to the PRC and reliance on Chinese student tuition fees.

Academics in British universities teaching on Chinese topics were also warned by the Chinese government to support the Chinese Communist Party or be refused entry to the country. Professors who disregarded the warnings to speak more positively about the CCP have had their visas cancelled which prevents them from doing fieldwork in China. Chinese intelligence agencies have threatened academic freedom at British universities. Sheffield Hallam University was threatened and pressured to stop the publication of research on Uyghur forced labor by Laura Murphy.

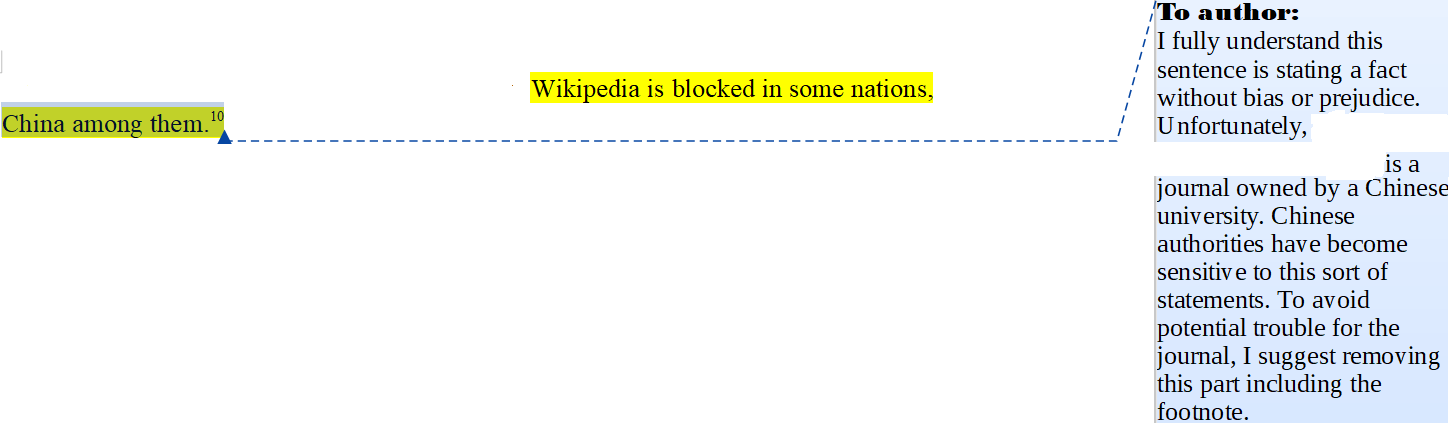
Self-censorship in an international English-language Chinese academic journal: an editor asks the article's author to remove a sentence about blocking of Wikipedia in mainland China as it could cause trouble with the "authorities"

American universities have engaged in self-censorship on Chinese issues, including North Carolina State University cancelling a visit by the Dalai Lama in 2009 and University of Maryland Chinese student Yang Shuping apologising after harsh reaction to her commencement speech praising the "fresh air" of democracy and freedom in the United States. In November 2019, Columbia University cancelled a panel on human rights in China titled "Panopticism with Chinese Characteristics: Human rights violations by the Chinese Communist Party and how they affect the world." Panel organizers criticized the university for allegedly compromising academic freedom by acquiescing to undue influence and threats of disturbances.

In March 2021, British Uyghur expert Joanne Smith Finley was sanctioned by China after she referred to the situation in Xinjiang as a genocide in comments given to the Associated Press.

In July 2021, more than 100 winners of the Nobel Prize published an open statement rebuking the Chinese government for pressuring the National Academy of Sciences to rescind a speaking invitation they had extended to Taiwanese Nobel Chemistry Prize winner Yuan T. Lee.

=== Confucius Institutes ===
Concerns have been raised about the activities of Chinese government-funded Confucius Institutes in western universities, which are subject to rules set by Beijing-based Hanban that prevent the discussion of sensitive topics including Tibet, Tiananmen Square and Taiwan. Institute learning materials also omit instances of humanitarian catastrophes under the Chinese Communist Party such as the Great Leap Forward and Cultural Revolution. Foreign Policy has likened Confucius Institutes to the "anaconda in the chandelier"; by their mere presence, they impact what staff and students feel safe discussing which leads to self-censorship. American critics include FBI director Christopher Wray and politicians Seth Moulton, Ted Cruz and Marco Rubio.

Human Rights Watch considers the Confucius Institutes to be extensions of the Chinese government that prioritise political loyalty in their hiring decisions.

Concerns arose following the 2014 Braga incident, in which materials for the Hanban-sponsored European Association for Chinese Studies 2014 conference in Braga were stolen and censored on the orders of Xu Lin, Director-General of Hanban and Chief Executive of the Confucius Institute Headquarters. Lin ordered the removal of references to Taiwanese academic institutions on the basis that they were "contrary to Chinese regulations", which The Wall Street Journal described as a "bullying approach to academic freedom". The incident led to a number of universities banning Confucius Institutes from their campuses, including Stockholm University, Copenhagen Business School, Stuttgart Media University, the University of Hohenheim, the University of Lyon, the University of Chicago, the University of Pennsylvania, the University of Michigan and McMaster University. Public schools in Toronto and New South Wales have also ceased their involvement in the program.

In 2019, media reports emerged that four of the University of Queensland's courses relating to China had been funded by the local Confucius Institute, with the university's senate ending such deals in May 2019. The university's vice-chancellor, Peter Høj, had previously been a senior consultant to Hanban.

Several Confucius Institute contracts included clauses requiring the host university to follow Confucius Institute Headquarters' edicts on "teaching quality", raising concerns about foreign influence and academic freedom. In 2020, the University of Melbourne and University of Queensland renegotiated their contracts to safeguard teaching autonomy in light of new Federal government laws requiring transparency on foreign influence.

=== Chinese Students and Scholars Association ===
The Chinese Students and Scholars Association (CSSA) has branches in various overseas university campuses. Many, though not all, of the associations are partly funded by, and report back to, the local Chinese Embassy. One of the aims of the Association is to "love the motherland". There is a history of branches pressuring their host university to cancel talks relating to Tibet, democracy movements of China, Uyghurs, the Hong Kong protests, and Falun Gong. The CSSA has also been found to put pressure on Chinese students overseas not to criticize the Chinese government.

The McMaster University branch in Canada had its club status revoked in 2019 after coordinating its opposition to a speech by Uyghur activist Rukiye Turdush with the local Chinese consulate, including sending back footage, in violation of student union rules. The University of Adelaide branch was deregistered for failing to follow democratic procedures.

== Airlines ==
In 2018, the Civil Aviation Administration of China sent letters to 44 international airlines demanding that they cease referring to Taiwan, Hong Kong and Macau as separate countries on their websites, or risk being classified as "severely untrustworthy" and subject to sanctions. Despite being criticised by the United States government as "Orwellian nonsense", all airlines complied. In 2020, Taiwan News reported that Taiwan's Ministry of Foreign Affairs had convinced 22 airlines to undo the change.

Airline	Date	Details
American Airlines	July 2018	The American carrier stopped listing Taiwan as a country on its website.
Delta Air Lines	July 2018	The American carrier stopped listing Taiwan as a country on its website.
Qantas	4 June 2018	The Australian carrier announced it would list Taiwan as a Chinese province rather than a separate country on its website, after earlier stating that listing Taiwan and Hong Kong as countries on its website was an "oversight".
United Airlines	July 2018	The American carrier stopped listing Taiwan as a country on its website.

== Film and music industry ==
Hollywood producers generally seek to comply with the Chinese government's censorship requirements in a bid to access the country's restricted and lucrative cinema market, with the second-largest box office in the world as of 2019. Western productions also engage in self-censorship on topics and themes that may trigger censorship and backlash in mainland China in order to access its lucrative domestic market, and to appease their financial investors. A memo issued by China's Ministry of Radio, Film and Television, sent to Jack Valenti, president of the Motion Picture Association and addressed to Chinese film offices, banned cooperation with the Hollywood studios that produced Red Corner (MGM/United Artists), Kundun (Disney) and Seven Years in Tibet (Columbia TriStar), as films that "viciously attack China [and] hurt Chinese people's feelings... Although . . . all kinds of efforts have been made, those three American companies are still pushing out above films... In order to protect Chinese national overall interests, it has been decided that all business cooperation with these three companies to be ceased temporarily without exception."

Testifying before the United States Senate Committee on Finance, Subcommittee on International Trade, Customs, and Global Competitiveness on "censorship as a non-tariff barrier" in 2020, Richard Gere, chairman of the board of directors for the International Campaign for Tibet, stated that economic interest compel studios to avoid social and political issues Hollywood once addressed, "Imagine Marty Scorsese's Kundun, about the life of the Dalai Lama, or my own film Red Corner, which is highly critical of the Chinese legal system. Imagine them being made today. It wouldn't happen."

Red Corner, a 1997 American film, was censored in China due to its unflattering portrayal of China's judicial system. Lead actor Richard Gere was vocal about how the film is "... a different angle of dealing with Tibet" and a political statement about China's oppression of Tibet, even though Tibet is never mentioned in the film. Chinese officials visited MGM, the film's studio and distributor, to ask why the studio was releasing the movie during the U.S. visit of CCP General Secretary Jiang Zemin. Gere claims his political activism regarding Tibet and his friendship with the Dalai Lama has disrupted his film career and effects the financing, production and distribution of films he is connected with.

A 2019 article by The Washington Post stated that Hollywood "tried to avoid content that authorities find morally or politically offensive" to win film distribution slots, and listed Red Dawn modifying the movie's villains as being from North Korea rather than from China as an example. The 2019 DreamWorks animated film Abominable included the PRC's nine-dash line in a map of the South China Sea shown during the movie, which resulted in the film being banned in Vietnam, Malaysia and the Philippines as it disputes the PRC's claim. In 2016, Marvel Entertainment attracted criticism for its decision to cast Tilda Swinton as the "Ancient One" in the film adaptation Doctor Strange, using a white woman to play a traditionally Tibetan character. The film's co-writer, C. Robert Cargill, stated in an interview that this was done to avoid angering China:

The Ancient One was a racist stereotype who comes from a region of the world that is in a very weird political place. He originates from Tibet, so if you acknowledge that Tibet is a place and that he's Tibetan, you risk alienating one billion people who think that that's bullshit and risk the Chinese government going, "Hey, you know one of the biggest film-watching countries in the world? We're not going to show your movie because you decided to get political."

Another instance of China censorship influence on Hollywood productions was when Mission: Impossible III deleted scenes shot in Shanghai, which featured "laundry drying on clotheslines from apartment buildings", that the Chinese censors requested be cut because they believed it presented a backward view of the country to the rest of the world. According to interviews conducted by human rights group PEN America, LGBT content was removed from Bohemian Rhapsody, Star Trek Beyond, Alien: Covenant and Cloud Atlas, to avoid antagonizing Chinese censors. In 2021, Chinese social media coverage of director Chloé Zhao's Oscar win was censored, as old social media posts of Zhao were considered to be critical of China. The releases of Zhao's Nomadland and Eternals, previously thought to be confirmed, were not approved for theatrical release in China.

Although Tibet was previously a cause célèbre in Hollywood, featuring in films including Kundun and Seven Years in Tibet, in the 21st century, this is no longer the case. Actor and high-profile Tibet supporter Richard Gere stated that he was no longer welcome to participate in mainstream Hollywood films after criticizing the PRC government in 1993, acting in a 1997 film critical of the PRC's legal system (Red Corner), and calling for a boycott of the 2008 Summer Olympics in Beijing. Brad Pitt was banned from China between 1997 and 2014 after starring in the film Seven Years in Tibet. Lady Gaga was banned in China a second time since she met with the Dalai Lama in 2016 at the 84th Annual U.S. Conference of Mayors in Indianapolis where she joined with the Dalai Lama to talk about the power of kindness and how to make the world a more compassionate place. An order was issued for state-controlled media to condemn this meeting by the Publicity Department of the Chinese Communist Party. Gaga was added to a list of hostile foreign forces, and Chinese websites and media organizations were ordered to stop distributing her songs. In China, her appearance was cut from the Friends: The Reunion special in 2021, and her image was blacked out in reporting on the 2019 Oscars in China. In March 2022, China's major online streaming services such as iQiyi, Tencent Video and Youku removed most of Keanu Reeves' filmography after he made a virtual appearance at a benefit concert for Tibet House, a nonprofit linked to the Dalai Lama.

During the promotional tour of Justin Lin's F9 in 2021, John Cena referred to Taiwan as "a country". He was subsequently forced to issue an apology on social media due to China's insistence that it considers Taiwan a part of China.

In April 2020, Chinese netizens in Bangkok criticised people who questioned the One-China Principle. The statement came as a response to a Thai actor, Vachirawit Chivaaree, who inadvertently liked a Tweet featuring cityscapes, one being Hong Kong, with a caption describing it as a country. He immediately deleted the image on noticing; however, the issue forced an apology from the actor. In 2017, his ex-girlfriend was found to have shared an Instagram post calling herself a Taiwanese girl wearing Chinese dress. This began a "Thai-Chinese Meme War". The CCP-controlled Global Times claimed his show experienced a backlash in China. According to Reuters, "The Milk Tea Alliance" has become a grassroots democracy movement in Taiwan and Hong Kong.

== Video games ==
Censorship affects global releases of Chinese games, or non-Chinese games that are available for Chinese players. This affects content available to players outside China. For example, the chat in the English-language version of Genshin Impact censors not only swear words but also words such as Taiwan, Tibet, Hong, Kong, Falun Gong, Stalin, Hitler and Putin. A study of about 200 Chinese games found out that over 180,000 words have been subject to blacklisting. Due to the sensitive nature of this topic, many companies, including many outside China like Riot Games, Electronic Arts, Activision Blizzard, Ubisoft, GOG and Krafton, tend to avoid commenting on this issue, preferring silence to the risk of offending either the Chinese authorities or their critics.

== International organizations ==
China strongly opposes the participation of Taiwan in international organisations as a violation of the One China Principle, and Taiwan may only participate in international bodies as "Chinese Taipei" or "Taiwan, China".

Chinese Taipei was initially agreed under the Nagoya Resolution as the name to be used for the Taiwanese team at the Olympic Games from the 1980s. Under PRC pressure, Taiwan is referred to by other international organisations under different names, such as "Taiwan Province of China" by the International Monetary Fund and "Taiwan District" by the World Bank. The PRC government has also pressured international beauty pageants including Miss World, Miss Universe and Miss Earth to only allow Taiwanese contestants competing under the designation "Miss Chinese Taipei" rather than "Miss Taiwan".

In January 2020, as the coronavirus epidemic expanded beyond China's borders and international commentators criticized Taiwan's exclusion from various United Nations agencies, the International Civil Aviation Organization (ICAO) blocked numerous Twitter accounts – including ones belonging to Capitol Hill staffers and D.C.-based analysts – after facing online criticism for excluding Taiwan from membership. Both ICAO and their Twitter account were run by Chinese nationals.

On 23 September 2020, Wikimedia's application for the status as an official observer at the World Intellectual Property Organization was rejected by Chinese government because China's representative claimed that they had "spotted a large amount of content and disinformation in violation of [the] One China principle" on webpages affiliated with Wikimedia, and Wikimedia's Taiwan branch has been "carrying out political activities... which could undermine the state's sovereignty and territorial integrity".

In May 2026, the RightsCon annual conference, scheduled to take place in Zambia, was cancelled due to pressure from the Chinese government. The conference's sponsor, Access Now, wrote that it was "told that diplomats from the People's Republic of China (PRC) were putting pressure on the Government of Zambia because Taiwanese civil society participants were planning to join us in person."

== Journalism ==
The PRC limits press freedom, with Xi Jinping telling state media outlets in 2016 that the Chinese Communist Party expects their "absolute loyalty". In Hong Kong, inconvenient journalists face censorship by stealth through targeted violence, arrests, withdrawal of official advertising and/or dismissal. Foreign journalists also face censorship given the ease with which their articles can be translated and shared across the country.

Foreign journalists have reported rising official interference with their work, with a 2016 Foreign Correspondents' Club of China survey finding 98% considered reporting conditions failed to meet international standards. Interference includes withholding a visa to work in the country, harassment and violence by secret police and requiring press conference questions to be submitted for pre-screening. Journalists also reported that local sources who speak to them face harassment, intimidation or detention by government officials, leading to a decreased willingness to cooperate with journalists. Foreign journalists also face hacking of their email accounts by the PRC to discover their sources.

The 2017 results indicated increasing violence and obstruction, with BBC reporter Matthew Goddard being punched by assailants who attempted to steal his equipment after he refused to show them footage taken. In 2017, 73% of foreign journalists reported being restricted or prohibited from reporting in Xinjiang, up from 42% in 2016. Journalists also reported more pressure from PRC diplomats on their headquarters to delete stories.

Visas have been denied to a number of foreign journalists who wrote articles displeasing to the PRC government, such as the treatment of Uyghurs in Xinjiang. Expelled journalists include L'Obs reporter Ursula Gauthier, Al Jazeera journalist Melissa Chan in 2012, BuzzFeed China bureau chief Megha Rajagopalan in 2018, and Bethany Allen-Ebrahimian, who was denied a visa in 2019 after being hired by AFP.

As a result of increasing intimidation and the threat of being denied a visa, foreign journalists operating in China have increasingly engaged in self-censorship. Topics avoided by journalists include Xinjiang, Tibet and Falun Gong. Despite this, controversial stories continue to be published on occasion, such as the hidden wealth of political elites including Wen Jiabao and Xi Jinping.

The PRC government has also increasingly sought to influence public opinion abroad by hiring foreign reporters for state media outlets and paying for officially sanctioned "China Watch" inserts to be included in overseas newspapers including The New York Times, The Wall Street Journal, The Washington Post and The Daily Telegraph.

In April 2021, a diplomatic controversy arose between Sweden and China when Jojje Olsson, a Swedish journalist posted in Taiwan, published a series of threatening letters sent to him by the Chinese Embassy in Sweden.

== Diplomacy and foreign relations ==
Since Xi Jinping took control over foreign affairs for the People's Republic of China, the regime has adopted "a truculent posture" in international relations, including what is said about China or its interests. The New York Times columnist Nicholas Kristof has observed that "Xi doesn't want to censor information just in his own country; he also wants to censor our own discussions in the West." A key example is how Beijing opposes any meeting by foreign politicians with the Dalai Lama, even in a personal capacity. However, its response differs depending on the political leaders and nations involved.

=== Australia ===
By November 2019, the PRC refused travel visas to Australian politicians Andrew Hastie and James Paterson after they criticised the Chinese Communist Party, its interference in Australian politics and its poor human rights record. The Chinese Embassy stated that the pair needed to "repent" before they would be allowed into the country, which Hastie and Paterson refused.

=== Canada ===
In 2015, the PRC detained then deported a Chinese-Canadian politician Richard Lee on the basis he had "endangered national security" by speaking out against PRC interference in Canadian politics.

=== Czech Republic ===
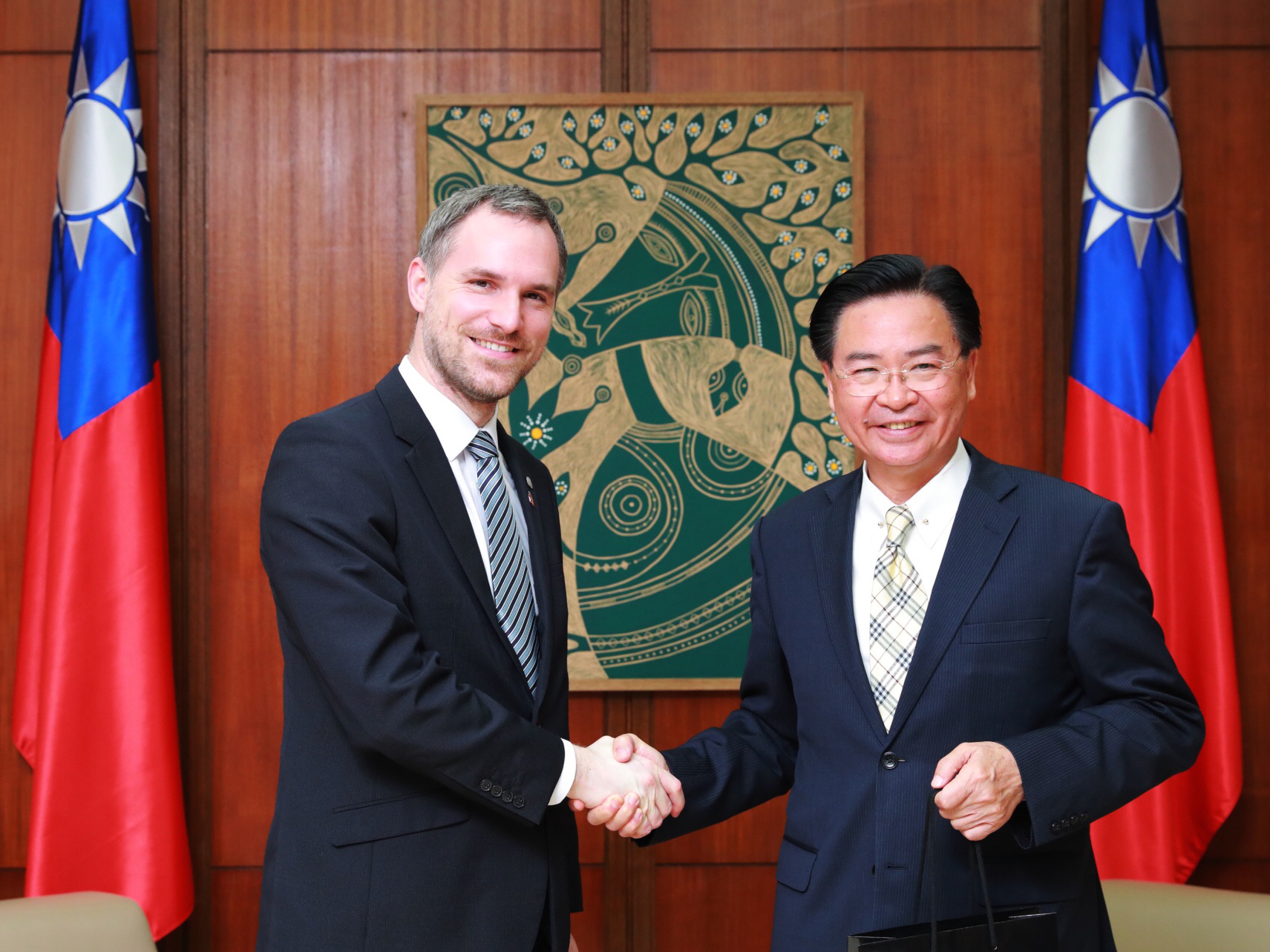
Zdeněk Hřib (left), the mayor of Prague, decided to maintain official relations with Taiwan – seen here with the Taiwan Minister, Joseph Wu (right) on 1 April 2019.

Soon after becoming mayor of Prague, Zdeněk Hřib hosted a meeting of foreign diplomats, and was asked by the Chinese ambassador to expel the Taiwanese representative. He refused to do so. China pointed out that Prague had already agreed to a One-China policy when the previous mayor had entered an agreement to make Beijing Prague's twin city. When Hřib asked to renegotiate the agreement, China cut off contact, refusing to reply to letters or emails, threatening to withhold funds for a Prague soccer club and unilaterally canceled the Prague Symphony Orchestra's China tour, moves which Hřib described as "bullying". In January 2020, Hřib ended Prague's city-to-city agreement with Beijing, creating a new agreement with Taipei instead. When Czech Senator Jaroslav Kubera announced plans to visit Taiwan, China announced that "Czech companies whose representatives visit Taiwan with chairman Kubera will not be welcome in China or with the Chinese people." Shortly after receiving this threat, Kubera died of a heart attack.

=== European Union ===
In 2021, China imposed sanctions on five members of the European Parliament and members of the EU human rights and security committee because of EU statements and action regarding the repression of the Uyghurs.

=== Germany ===
In 2016, the Chinese Ambassador to Germany "put massive pressure" on the Chairman of the Bundestag's Human Rights Committee, Michael Brand, a member of the conservative CDU party, in connection to his work exposing human rights abuses in Tibet. He later said, "self-censorship is out of the question".

In August 2019, a delegation of the German Bundestag due to visit China had all their visas blocked as one of its members, Margarete Bause, a Green, is a vocal supporter of the Muslim Uyghur minority. She believes that to be "an attempt at silencing parliamentarians who support human rights loudly and clearly".

=== Japan ===
In June 2021, China lodged diplomatic and public protests after Japanese Prime Minister Yoshihide Suga referred to Taiwan as a country. According to spokesperson Wang Wenbin, "China expresses strong dissatisfaction with Japan's erroneous remarks and has lodged a solemn protest against Japan."

=== Lithuania ===
In March 2021, China blacklisted Lithuanian MP Dovilė Šakalienė because of comments she made regarding human rights.

=== New Zealand ===
Jenny Shipley was Prime Minister of New Zealand and, after leaving politics, served as a director of China Construction Bank global board for six years from 2007 to 2013, then as Chair of China Construction Bank New Zealand up until 31 March 2019. In a case of what may be compelled speech, rather than restricted speech, the former Prime Minister appeared to write an opinion piece, "We need to learn to listen to China" in the Communist Party controlled newspaper, People's Daily. It contained strong endorsements of current Chinese foreign policy, such as "The belt and road initiative (BRI) proposed by China is one of the greatest ideas we've ever heard globally. It is a forward-looking idea, and in my opinion, it has the potential to create the next wave of economic growth." Ms Shipley later denied ever writing the article."

In May 2020, efforts were made to silence criticism of China by Winston Peters, the current serving Foreign Minister of New Zealand. Matthew Hooton, a columnist at The New Zealand Herald, said that Peters should be sacked if he insults China one more time.

In July 2025, the Chinese Embassy in New Zealand attempted to block the screening of the documentary Food Delivery: Fresh From the West Philippine Sea by sending a letter to the DocEdge Festival in Auckland, criticizing the film as propaganda and urging the cancellation of future showings. In response, the Doc Edge general manager Rachael Penman said they had refused the request and willingly stood by all their filmmakers. The Chinese Consulate General in Auckland echoed the demand, claiming the documentary spread disinformation and served as a political tool to advance the Philippines’ maritime claims. In response, New Zealand's Ministry of Foreign Affairs affirmed its support for freedom of expression, and the festival proceeded with the screenings.

=== Sweden ===
On 15 November 2019, the Culture Minister of Sweden, Amanda Lind, went against the wishes of the Chinese Communist Party leadership and awarded Gui Minhai the PEN Tucholsky prize in absentia. Mr Gui, a Chinese-born Swedish citizen had published poetry critical of the Chinese government and was said to be preparing a book about the love life of Xi Jinping and had been arrested by Chinese security agents whilst being accompanied by Swedish diplomats on a train from Shanghai to Beijing. Following the award, China's embassy in Stockholm released a statement saying that Minister Lind's attendance was "a serious mistake" and that "wrong deeds will only meet with bad consequences". In the days afterwards China's Ambassador to Sweden, Gui Congyou, announced that "two large delegations of businessmen who were planning to travel to Sweden have cancelled their trip" Ms Lind has already been threatened with a ban on entering China if she went ahead with the prize giving. Later that month the Ambassador later gave an interview on Swedish public radio in which he said, "We treat our friends with fine wine, but for our enemies we have shotguns."

=== United Kingdom ===
In 2019, the Chinese Ambassador to the United Kingdom warned that country's politicians against adopting a "colonial mindset" and observing limits in their comments on issues such as the Hong Kong protests and South China Sea dispute with China's neighbours. China later suspended the Stock Connect link between the Shanghai and London stock exchanges, in part due to the United Kingdom's support for Hong Kong protesters.

== Publishing ==
Cambridge University Press drew criticism in 2017 for removing articles from its China Quarterly covering topics such as the 1989 Tiananmen Square massacre, Tibet, Xinjiang, Hong Kong and the Cultural Revolution to avoid having its Chinese operations shut down. Attempts of censorship are documented for Brill and Taylor & Francis. Springer Nature also acceded to Chinese demands to censor articles relating to Chinese politics, Taiwan, Tibet and human rights. In August 2020, Springer Nature was reported to have rejected the publication of an article at the behest of its co-publisher, Wenzhou Medical University, from a Taiwanese doctor because the word "China" was not placed after "Taiwan." Springer Nature has removed articles without even informing the authors and refused "to reverse the decision but continuing to justify it as being in the best interests of the global academic community and necessary for the advancement of research".

In 2017, the Australian publisher Allen & Unwin refused to publish Clive Hamilton's book Silent Invasion about growing Chinese Communist Party influence in Australia, fearing potential legal action from the Chinese government or its local proxies under the auspices of the United Front Work Department.

Publishers using Chinese printers have also been subject to local censorship, even for books not intended for sale in China. Books with maps face particular scrutiny, with one Victoria University Press book Fifteen Million Years in Antarctica required to remove the English term "Mount Everest" in favour of the Chinese equivalent "Mount Qomolangma", and a 2026 catalogue for the Victoria and Albert museum had to remove a 1930s map of the British Empire's trade routes which showed Chinese borders different from the PRC's standard at the time of the catalogue's printing. This has led publishers to consider printers in alternative countries, such as Vietnam.

Whistleblower Edward Snowden criticised Chinese censors for removing passages in the translated version of his book Permanent Record, in which passages about authoritarianism, democracy, freedom of speech and privacy were removed.

== Digital Silk Road ==
The Digital Silk Road has been described as a pathway to export China's system of mass surveillance and censorship technology of the Great Firewall to multiple countries.

== Technology companies ==
Several American technology companies cooperate with Chinese government policies, including internet censorship, such as helping authorities build the Great Firewall to restrict access to sensitive information. Yahoo drew controversy after supplying the personal data of its user Shi Tao to the PRC government, resulting in Tao's 10-year imprisonment for "leaking state secrets abroad". In 2006, Microsoft, Google, Yahoo! and Cisco appeared before a congressional inquiry into their Chinese operations where their cooperation with censorship and privacy breaches of individuals faced criticism. U.S. video conferencing company Zoom, which bases most of its research and development team in China, closed the account of a U.S.-based user who held a Zoom vigil commemorating the Tiananmen Square massacre.

The Chinese government is increasingly pressuring overseas individuals and companies to cooperate with its censorship model, including in relation to overseas communications made by foreign people for non-Chinese audiences.

WeChat, the China-based social media platform owned by Tencent has been described by the BBC as a "powerful weapon of social control". WeChat is known to have censoring messages concerning the coronavirus. A report by the Citizen Lab found that Tencent also uses the platform for the surveillance of foreign nationals.

In December 2020, WeChat blocked a post by Australian Prime Minister Scott Morrison during a diplomatic spat between Australia and China. In his WeChat post Morrison had criticized a doctored image posted by a Chinese diplomat and praised the Chinese-Australian community. The company claimed to have blocked the post because it "violated regulations, including distorting historical events and confusing the public".

On 4 June 2021, the 32nd anniversary of the 1989 Tiananmen Square protests and massacre, searches for the Tank Man image and videos were censored by Microsoft's Bing search engine worldwide. Hours after Microsoft acknowledged the issue, the search returned only pictures of tanks elsewhere in the world. Search engines that license results from Microsoft such as DuckDuckGo and Yahoo faced similar issues. Microsoft said the issue was "due to an accidental human error". The director of Human Rights Watch, Kenneth Roth, said he found the idea it was an inadvertent error "hard to believe". David Greene, Civil Liberties Director at the Electronic Frontier Foundation, said that content moderation was impossible to do perfectly and "egregious mistakes are made all the time", but he further elaborated that "At worst, this was purposeful suppression at the request of a powerful state."

Apple has allowed political censorship for the Chinese market to spill into other markets.

A 2023 study of TikTok by Rutgers University researchers found a "strong possibility that content on TikTok is either amplified or suppressed based on its alignment with the interests of the Chinese government." Commenting on the study, The New York Times stated, "[a]lready, there is evidence that China uses TikTok as a propaganda tool. Posts related to subjects that the Chinese government wants to suppress — like Hong Kong protests and Tibet — are strangely missing from the platform."

In August 2024, Rutgers University researchers released a new report based on user journey data. By searching for four keywords — Uyghur, Xinjiang, Tibet, and Tiananmen — on TikTok, YouTube, and Instagram, the researchers found that TikTok's algorithm displayed a higher percentage of positive, neutral, or irrelevant content related to China's human rights abuses compared to the other two apps. The researchers also found that users spending three hours or more daily on TikTok were significantly more positive about China's human rights records than non-users. TikTok dismissed NCRI's study.

== Sports ==
In 2019, ESPN's Chuck Salituro, the channel's senior news director, sent an internal memo to staff banning any discussion of political issues concerning China or Hong Kong when covering the controversy of Daryl Morey's tweet in support of Hong Kong protesters. In October 2019, Houston Rockets general manager Daryl Morey apologized for his tweet featuring the slogan: "Fight for Freedom, Stand with Hong Kong." The apology came after China's consulate general in Houston demanded the team to "immediately correct the mistakes". Following Morey's deleted tweet, China's state broadcaster CCTV-5 and Tencent Sports suspended airing and live-streaming Houston Rockets events. The NBA acknowledged that Morey's views "have deeply offended many of our friends and fans in China, which is regrettable," but NBA Commissioner Adam Silver would not apologize for the tweet.

In October 2021, Chinese broadcaster and NBA partner Tencent blocked Boston Celtics games after Celtics player Enes Kanter Freedom made Twitter remarks supporting Tibet's freedom. He also called CCP General Secretary Xi Jinping a "dictator" on social media. China accused Kanter Freedom of "clout-chasing" and "trying to get attention".

At the 2021 24 Hours of Le Mans car race, a Taiwanese team was asked by event organizers to switch the Taiwanese national flag for the Chinese Taipei flag.

In October 2026, French footballer Kylian Mbappé apologized after apparently referring to Mao Zedong as a "Chinese dictator" while discussing a meme that placed his face on an image of Mao. At least three Chinese companies ended their sponsorship deals with him.

== Notable instances ==
The table below includes notable instances outside China where a government, company or other entity has either censored, or been censored on, a China-related issue.

Entity	Date	Details
Microsoft	4 January 2006	The company removed the blog of Chinese journalist Zhao Jing from its MSN Spaces website, which was hosted on servers based in the United States.
Nasdaq	February 2007	In 2007, Nasdaq's Chinese representative Laurence Pan was detained and interrogated by Chinese state security about access to its exchange by New Tang Dynasty Television, a Falun Gong-linked media organisation. That organisation was subsequently denied access by Nasdaq.
Eutelsat	2008	The media company cut New Tang Dynasty Television's signal to "show a good gesture to the Chinese government".
Government of Vietnam	11 November 2011	The country imprisoned two Falun Gong activists who transmitted radio messages into China for "illegal transmission of information on a telecommunications network".
Bing	12 February 2014	The search engine censored simplified Chinese language results for users in the United States for search terms including "Dalai Lama", "June 4 incident", Falun Gong and anti-censorship tool Freegate.
LinkedIn	4 June 2014	The company blocked users outside China from viewing content posted by Chinese users that is restricted by the Chinese government.
Chou Tzu-yu	16 January 2016	The Taiwan-born K-pop singer issued an apology for being pictured with the Taiwanese flag, following sustained online attacks on her and her band Twice by Chinese internet users.
Microsoft	22 November 2016	The company programmed its Chinese language artificial intelligence-based chatbot Xiaobing to avoid discussing sensitive topics such as Tiananmen Square.
Apple Inc.	7 January 2017	The company removed the New York Times app from its Chinese app store following Chinese government advice that it violated local regulations. This led to the company being accused by online advocates of "globalising Chinese censorship".
Allen & Unwin	12 November 2017	The Australian publisher refused to publish Clive Hamilton's book Silent Invasion about growing Chinese Communist Party influence in Australia on the basis that it feared legal action from the Chinese government or its proxies.
Marriott International	12 January 2018	The hotel chain issued an apology and was ordered by the Cyberspace Administration of China to shut its Chinese website and booking application for one week after an employee managing its social media "liked" a tweet thanking the company for listing Tibet as a country on a customer questionnaire alongside Taiwan, Hong Kong and Macau. After the Shanghai Municipal Tourism Administration ordered the company to "seriously deal with the people responsible", it dismissed the employee.
Mercedes-Benz	7 February 2018	The German car maker issued an apology on Weibo for "hurting the feelings" of the people of China after quoting the Dalai Lama on Instagram, a service banned in China. The company also sent a formal letter to the Chinese Ambassador in Germany, stating that it had "no intention of questioning or challenging in any manner China's sovereignty or territorial integrity."
Gap Inc.	15 May 2018	The company apologised after photographs circulated of a T-shirt sold in Canada that featured a map of China omitting Taiwan, Tibet and China's South China Sea territorial claim.
Red Candle Games	26 February 2019	Red Candle Games pulled Devotion from Steam after it was review bombed due to an unflattering reference to Xi Jinping.
TikTok	25 September 2019	The Guardian revealed the TikTok app's moderation guidelines prohibiting content mentioning Tiananmen Square, Tibetan independence and Falun Gong. Content criticising the Chinese government's persecution of ethnic minorities or mentioning the 2019–2020 Hong Kong protests are also removed. ByteDance, the app's Beijing-based owner responded to the media reports by stating that the leaked moderation guidelines were "outdated" and that it had introduced localised guidelines for different countries. Searches relating to Hong Kong on the app found no content referencing the ongoing protests. Facebook founder Mark Zuckerberg also criticised the platform for its censorship of Hong Kong protest content, asking "is this the internet we want?"
Apple Inc.	2 October 2019	The company banned the HKmap.live app from its App Store, which allowed for crowd-sourced information about the location of protesters and police in Hong Kong. It did so on the basis that the app "allowed users to evade law enforcement". The same month, Apple banned the Quartz app due to its coverage of the 2019‍–‍2020 Hong Kong protests.
Sheraton	3 October 2019	The chain's Stockholm hotel cancelled a celebration of Taiwan's Double Ten national holiday after pressure from the Chinese Ambassador; it was moved to a local museum.
Tiffany & Co.	7 October 2019	The jewellery company deleted a photo on one of its social media accounts of a woman covering one eye, which a number of Chinese internet users considered to evoke the image of a Hong Kong protester who had been shot in one eye.
Activision Blizzard	8 October 2019	In the Blitzchung controversy, the company withdrew the prize from the winner of an online game tournament after he wore a mask and spoke in support of the 2019–20 Hong Kong protests in a post-game interview, stating "Liberate Hong Kong, revolution of our times". The company is partly owned by Tencent. In August 2020, Activision Blizzard removed imagery of the 1989 Tiananmen Square protests from its trailer of Call of Duty: Black Ops Cold War.
Wells Fargo Center, Philadelphia	9 October 2019	Center staff removed fans shouting "Free Hong Kong" at a pre-season game between the Philadelphia 76ers and Guangzhou Loong Lions.
National Basketball Association	10 October 2019	CNN journalist Christina Macfarlane was shut down and had her microphone removed at an NBA press conference after asking players James Harden and Russell Westbrook if they would feel differently about speaking out in future following the NBA's censorship of comments that are critical of China.
Christian Dior	17 October 2019	Christian Dior issued a public apology on its Weibo account for displaying a map during a university presentation that did not include Taiwan.
Maserati	25 October 2019	Maserati asked a local car dealership to cut all ties with Taiwan's Golden Horse Film Festival and Awards and stated that it "firmly upholds the one‑China principle."
Shutterstock	6 November 2019	In November 2019, The Intercept reported that Shutterstock censors certain search results for users in mainland China. The six banned terms were "Xi Jinping", "Mao Zedong", "Taiwan flag", "dictator", "yellow umbrella" and "Chinese flag" and variations. After 180 employees (one-fifth of the workforce) signed a petition opposing the censorship, company executive Stan Pavlovsky told staff that anyone opposed to its self-censorship was free to resign.
WeChat	25 November 2019	Reports emerged that China-based WeChat was censoring users in the United States communicating about Hong Kong politics.
DC Comics	27 November 2019	DC Comics removed a promotional Batman poster after it triggered criticism from mainland China netizens that its imagery, featuring Batwoman throwing a Molotov cocktail beside the words "The future is young", was sympathetic to Hong Kong protesters.
TikTok	28 November 2019	The platform apologised after blocking American user Feroza Aziz following a video which she made drawing attention to the mistreatment of Muslims in the Xinjiang re-education camps, which she disguised as a make-up tutorial to evade censorship.
Condé Nast	6 December 2019	GQ magazine removed Xi Jinping from its "Worst Dressed" list on its website along with the caption: "It is not Hong Kong's courageous freedom fighters that Xi Jinping should have a problem with. It's his tailor. Xi gets totalitarian style cues from his hero, the mass murderer chairman Mao, who enforced a dour and plain dress code for the Communist Party."
Arsenal F.C.	15 December 2019	Arsenal footballer Mesut Özil posted a poem on his social media account denouncing China's treatment of Uyghurs in Xinjiang re-education camps and the silence of Muslim countries on the issue. Arsenal later released a statement distancing itself from the comments. China's state broadcaster China Central Television responded two days later by removing the match between Arsenal and Manchester City from its schedule.
World Health Organization	28 March 2020	Senior advisor Bruce Aylward faced criticism for saying he could not hear a question from RTHK journalist Yvonne Tong about whether Taiwan could join the WHO, asking her to move onto the next question then terminating the interview when she repeated it. The World Health Organization has also faced criticism for downplaying Taiwan's success in fighting the COVID-19 pandemic.
European Union	24 April 2020	The organisation agreed to censor references to the Chinese origins of the COVID-19 pandemic, with research suggesting that self‑censorship on sensitive topics that may offend the PRC is commonplace.
YouTube	26 May 2020	Reports emerged that since October 2019, comments posted with the Chinese characters 共匪 (gòngfěi or "communist bandit", an insult dating back to China's Nationalist government) or 五毛 (wǔmáo or "50 Cent Party", referring to State-sponsored commentators) were being automatically deleted within 15 seconds.
FK Radnički Niš	10 June 2020	The Serbian SuperLiga football club fired goal scorer Hao Runze amidst pressure from the Chinese government, after his father Hao Haidong criticised the Chinese Communist Party and called for a federal China.
Zoom	12 June 2020	The videoconferencing provider confirmed that it had suspended the accounts of users based in the United States and Hong Kong who booked meeting to discuss the Tiananmen Square Massacre and Hong Kong protests following PRC Government complaints, and that it would seek to limit such actions to people based in the mainland in future.
ANZ Bank	17 July 2020	The bank distanced itself from its Singapore‑based global head of credit Bogac Ozdemir, after he wrote a LinkedIn post blaming China for the COVID-19 pandemic. The bank issued a statement claiming that Ozdemir's post showed "a distinct lack of judgment", which resulted in him launching a defamation lawsuit.
Charles Darwin University	29 July 2020	After a sustainability course run by engineering professor Charlie Fairfield featured a roleplay about the "Chinese (Wuhan) COVID-19 virus outbreak", several Chinese students complained by falsely stating that the virus had been found in Europe before Wuhan and accusing him of "racism and hatred". The university apologised for any offence caused and stated that changes had been made to ensure it would not recur.
University of New South Wales	5 August 2020	The university deleted social media posts about an academic's call for international pressure against the Chinese Communist Party for limiting human rights in Hong Kong, following a backlash from Chinese students. The university issued an English-language apology, stating the deletion was a mistake and emphasising the importance of free speech and academic freedom. The university issued a separate Chinese-language statement omitting its references to freedom of expression and academic freedom and which appeared to convey the opposite message, stating that the university did not take any political stances and was "disturbed" by any trouble caused.
CD Projekt	16 December 2020	CD Projekt announced that it would not release Taiwanese-developed game Devotion on its GOG.com platform due to an unflattering reference to Xi Jinping.
NASA	31 March 2021	The American space agency faced criticism in China for listing "Taiwan" as a country in a drop-down menu on a website about Mars.
H&M, Nike, Burberry	March–April 2021	After the clothing brands announced they would stop sourcing cotton from Xinjiang due to concerns about Uyghur forced labour, they faced a Chinese boycott social media campaign, withdrawal of local brand ambassadors, revocation of store leases and removal from online portals in China. This prompted other companies such as Inditex, the owner of Zara to remove anti-slavery statements from their websites. H&M announced it was "dedicated to regaining trust" in China, and changed an online "problematic map of China" following a demand from the Shanghai City Government.
Microsoft	4 June 2021	On the 32nd anniversary of the 1989 Tiananmen Square massacre, searches for the Tank Man image and videos were censored by Microsoft's Bing search engine worldwide.
Kodak	July 2021	Kodak removed a post from its Instagram feed featuring images from Xinjiang by a photographer documenting the increasing repression of Uyghurs and described his images as cataloguing the region's "abrupt descent into an Orwellian dystopia". Following backlash from supporters of Beijing on social media, Kodak removed the post and issued an apology.
Apple Inc.	August 2022	Apple warned its suppliers not to use "made in Taiwan" labeling.
Mars, Incorporated	August 2022	Mars apologized for referring to Taiwan as a country in promotional material and promised to adjust its language with respect to Taiwan.
Midjourney	March 2023	In March 2023, the Midjourney's CEO, David Holz, stated that Midjourney is blocked for political satire of Xi Jinping and that "the ability for people in China to use this tech is more important than your ability to generate satire."
Bulgari	July 2023	In July 2023, Bulgari issued an apology for listing Taiwan as a country on its website.
University College London	March 2024	In March 2024, the University College London launched an internal investigation after a department banned an academic from teaching a "provocative" modern slavery course involving China in order to remain "commercially viable".
TikTok	June 2024	A Filipino journalist's video on TikTok discussing his experience covering the West Philippine Sea (South China Sea) was muted shortly after posting, sparking speculation that TikTok, owned by the Chinese company ByteDance, was censoring content critical of China and leading to calls to ban the app in the Philippines.
Guimet Museum	September 2024	In September 2024, the Guimet Museum removed all mentions of the word "Tibet" from its catalogues and exhibitions in favor of the Chinese government term "Xizang Autonomous Region."
Musée du Quai Branly – Jacques Chirac	September 2024	In September 2024, the Musée du Quai Branly removed all mentions of the word "Tibet" from its catalogues and exhibitions in favor of the Chinese government term "Xizang Autonomous Region."
Marvel Games	January 2025	Certain phrases related to the persecution of Uyghurs in China, the 1989 Tiananmen Square protests and massacre, Taiwan independence, "Free Hong Kong," Winnie the Pooh, and other issues are blocked inside of the in-game chat function.
Puregold	12 March 2025	The board of directors of Puregold had the documentary film Food Delivery be pulled out from its CinePanalo Film Festival. The film covers the plight of Filipino fishermen as well as Filipino coast guard and navy personnel in the South China Sea. The Directors' Guild of the Philippines called the withdrawal of the film censorship. The film later premiered on 30 June 2025 in New Zealand as part of the DocEdge Film Festival. On 4 July, the Chinese consulate in Auckland requested the film festival organizers to stop future screenings on the film. This request was not heeded to.
Vultr	December 2025	At the request of Tencent, U.S. cloud hosting provider Vultr terminated GreatFire's FreeWeChat website, which tracks WeChat posts censored in China.
Victoria and Albert Museum	April 2026	The Victoria and Albert museum agreed to censor images of a 1930s-era map of the British Empire's trade routes at the request of the General Administration of Press and Publication; this map showed historical Chinese borders which diverge from the PRC national standard at the time of printing.

== Opposition and resistance ==
Inter-Parliamentary Alliance on China was established by overseas politicians in 2020 following PRC retaliation against criticism by individual politicians.

In 2010, Google opposed China's censorship policies, ultimately leaving the country. By 2017, the company had dropped its opposition, including planning a Chinese Communist Party‑approved censored search engine named Project Dragonfly. Work on the project was terminated in 2019.

In 2019, Comedy Central's animated sitcom South Park released the episode "Band in China", which satirised the self-censorship of Hollywood producers to suit Chinese censors and featured one character yelling "Fuck the Chinese government!". This was followed by a mock apology from the show's creators Trey Parker and Matt Stone, which also made light of a recent controversy involving the NBA's alleged appeasement of Chinese government censorship:

Like the NBA, we welcome the Chinese censors into our homes and into our hearts. We too love money more than freedom and democracy. Tune into our 300th episode this Wednesday at 10! Long live the great Communist Party of China. May the autumn's sorghum harvest be bountiful. We good now China?

The show was banned in mainland China following the incident. Protesters in Hong Kong screened the episode on the city's streets. The musician Zedd was banned from China after liking a tweet from South Park.

=== Politics ===
On 4 June 2020, politicians from eight democratic countries formed the Inter-Parliamentary Alliance on China, an international cross-party alliance focused on concerns with the PRC and the Chinese Communist Party, including its attempts to censor or punish those making adverse comments. It is chaired by Iain Duncan Smith, former leader of the British Conservative Party.

=== Milk Tea Alliance ===
The Milk Tea Alliance is an online democratic solidarity movement of netizens from Thailand, Hong Kong, and Taiwan. The Milk Tea Alliance arose in response to the increased presence of Chinese 50 Cent Party, Internet Water Army, and Little Pink trolls and nationalist commentators on social media. Milk tea is used as a symbol of anti-PRC solidarity by south-east Asians as tea is historically consumed with milk in their region, while in mainland China it is not.

The "Milk Tea Alliance" moniker emerged in 2020 after Chinese nationalist Internet commentators criticised the Thai actor Bright for "liking" an image on Twitter which referred to Hong Kong as a "country", and called for a boycott of his TV programme. Twitter users in Taiwan, Hong Kong, and the Philippines joined Thai users in what The Telegraph called "a rare moment of regional solidarity". Australia has also been suggested as a member of the Milk Tea Alliance, although its link to milk tea is tenuous so the baby formula product Aptamil is used instead to represent it. Following the 2020–2021 China–India skirmishes, India has also been included in some formulations of the Alliance with masala chai being their representative variety of milk tea.

Pallabi Munsi, writing in OZY, described the Milk Tea Alliance as "Asia's volunteer army rising against China's internet trolls."

== See also ==
- Censorship in China
- Censorship in Hong Kong
- Corporate censorship
  - Censorship by Apple#China
  - Cisco Systems#Censorship in China
  - Censorship by Google#China
  - Criticism of Microsoft#Censorship in China
  - Criticism of Myspace#MySpace China
  - National Basketball Association criticisms and controversies#2019–2020 Hong Kong protests
  - Skype#Service in the People's Republic of China
  - Criticism of Yahoo!#Work in the People's Republic of China
