= Manto Munshi (musician) =

Indian Bengali musician (1943–2010)

- Born: Sumitrajit Munshi; 23 October, 1943; Paikpara, Calcutta, India
- Died: 2 March, 2010 (aged 66 years); Tala Park, Kolkata, India
- Other name: Mozart
- Occupations: Pianist; bandleader; composer
- Father: Annada Munsi
- Relatives: Bubu Eklund (sister); Lars Eklund (brother-in-law); Manu Munsi (half-uncle)
- Family: Extended Munshi family of Kadirpara and Chougachi
- Musical career
- Genres: Rabindra Sangeet; Indian classical music; Western classical music; folk music; Kirtan
- Instruments: piano; accordion; mouth organ; violin; harmonium; tabla

Sumitrajit Munshi, better known as Manto Munshi (Bengali: ম্যান্টো মুন্সী; 23 October, 1943 – 2 March, 2010), was an Indian pianist, bandleader and composer based in Kolkata, India. A descendant of the extended Munshi family of Kadirpara and Chougachi, Munshi was born on October 23, 1943, to Indian artist Annada Munsi and Jayati Munshi in Paikpara, Kolkata.

== Early life ==
Educated at house, Munshi learnt music from his father Annada Munsi. Besides piano, Munshi eventually became a multi-instrumentalist proficient in playing 16 instruments, including accordion, mouth organ, violin, harmonium and tabla.

== Artistry ==
Munshi was noted for his exceptional musical ability and wide-ranging repertoire. He could perform a variety of Hindustani classical ragas and Western classical pieces (composed by Beethoven, Mozart and Franz Liszt), and compositions without written notation, reportedly relying on his strong memory and ability to reproduce music after hearing it once. In addition to Hindustani and Western classical music, he was also skilled at playing Rabindra Sangeet, folk songs, and kirtan melodies on the piano.

== Career ==
Munshi's professional career included work as a bandleader at the Great Eastern Hotel’s Maxim, and later at The Park Hotels and Hotel Metropole. His performances were appreciated by noted figures such as filmmaker Satyajit Ray and composer V. Balsara.

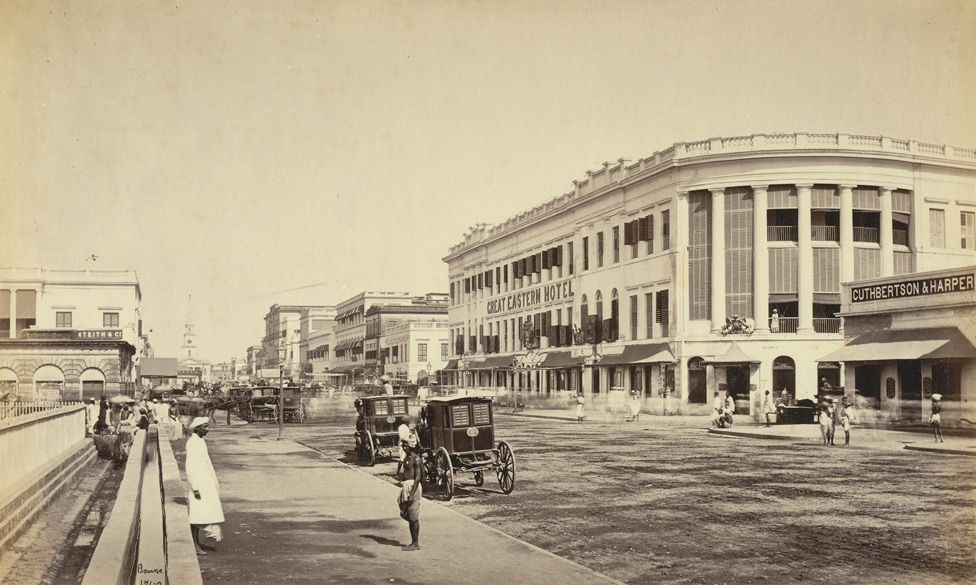
A 1865 photograph of the Great Eastern Hotel in Calcutta, where Munshi later performed

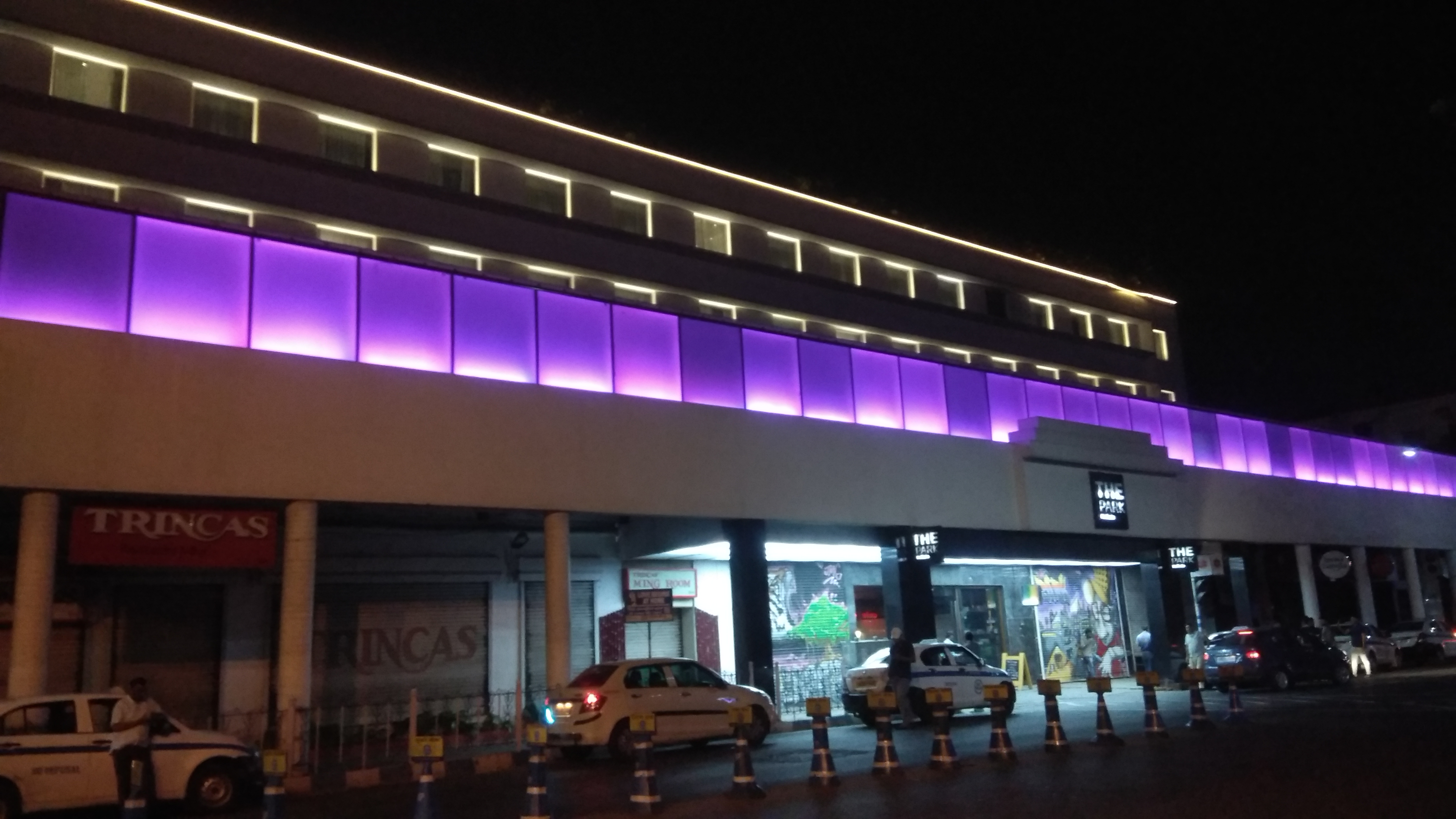
The Park Hotel Kolkata on Park Street, where Munshi performed

He performed at several venues, including a concert at Kolkata's Mahajati Sadan in 1982, where he collaborated with his father, Annada Munsi. In that performance, Munshi played the piano while his father played the violin. According to Anandabazar Patrika columnist Shankarlal Bhattacharya, their violin duet of Mozart's Eine kleine Nachtmusik was praised by Pandit Ravi Shankar. Annada Munsi reportedly described Satyajit Ray as "reincarnation of Beethoven" and his son Manto as a "reincarnation of Mozart", and referred to his son as "Mozart," a nickname that later became popular; Anandabazar Patrika also referred to Munshi as "Mozart" in 1971.

== Personal life ==
In his personal life, he married Poli Rana (later Munshi), a resident of Guwahati, in 1967, and had two sons.

== Death and legacy ==
Munshi died on March 2, 2010 in Tala Park, Kolkata. His biography was covered by Santanu Ghosh in two Bengali books named Binodane Paikpara Belgachia which covered the biographies of renowned residents of Paikpara-Belgachia area including Kazi Nazrul Islam, Annada Munsi, Nirendranath Chakraborty, Chunibala Devi, Manu Munsi, Manoj Mitra, Debshankar Haldar and so on, and Munshianay Chollish Purush which was mainly focused on the contributions of the Munshis of Kadirpara-Chougachi to the society. Both the books were reviewed in Anandabazar Patrika.
