= Washington March =

The Washington March may refer to:

== 1880s ==
- The Washington Post, a march composed by John Philip Sousa in 1889

== 1940s ==
- March on Washington Movement, a tool to organize a mass march from 1941 to 1946

== 1960s ==
- The March on Washington for Jobs and Freedom, one of the largest US human rights rallies and called for civil and economic rights for African Americans, on 28 August 1963

== 1970s ==
- March for Life (Washington, D.C.), an annual anti-abortion rally protesting abortion, on January 22 (or thereabouts) annually since 1974
- National March on Washington for Lesbian and Gay Rights, on October 14, 1979

== 1980s ==
- Second National March on Washington for Lesbian and Gay Rights, on October 11, 1987
- Washington March for Chinese Democracy, on October 1, 1989

== 1990s ==
- March on Washington for Lesbian, Gay and Bi Equal Rights and Liberation, on April 25, 1993

== 2000s ==
- Millennium March on Washington, an event to raise awareness and visibility of LGBT held from April 28 to April 30, 2000
- The Godless Americans March on Washington (GAMOW), on November 2, 2002
- Taxpayer March on Washington (also known as the 9/12 Tea Party), a Tea Party protest march on September 12, 2009
