= Prahlad Karmakar =

Indian painter (1900-1946)

- Born: 1900; Bikrampur, Bengal Presidency, British India
- Died: 1946; Kolkata, Bengal Presidency, India
- Known for: Painting
- Children: Prokash Karmakar

Prahlad Karmakar (Bengali: প্রহ্লাদ কর্মকার) (1900-1946) was an Indian painter of the 20th century. He was born in the year 1900 in the village of Bikrampur in the then undivided Bengal. In 1925 he was the first artist to set up a studio in Calcutta with facilities for the study of 'nude' art. His paintings are in the collections of the Government College of Art and Craft, the Academy of Fine Arts, Kolkata, the Department of Information under the Government of West Bengal, the Indian Museum in Kolkata and the Delhi Art Gallery. Karmakar's works are also within the list of the individual collections of Lady Wellington, Dr. Bhabani Charan Law family of Kolkata, Lord Lytton and the Pramatha Chaudhury.

Karmakar was a student of the Government College of Art and Craft, Calcutta. His son Prokash Karmakar was also a painter. One of his most prominent students was mother of pearl artist Manu Munshi. Artist Karmakar received the Academy of Fine Arts Award in Calcutta (for All India Art Exhibition). He was also received a silver medal at the San Francisco International Art Exhibition in 1939. In 1943, Karmakar won the bronze medal with merit at the Art Exhibition held in San Francisco. He was working as a Senior Professor in the Department of Advertising at the Government College of Art and Craft. He died in 1946 at the age of 46.
