= Independent Federation of Chinese Students and Scholars =

Student organization

The Independent Federation of Chinese Students and Scholars (IFCSS) was founded on August 1, 1989, when over 1,000 Chinese student representatives from more than 200 Chinese Students and Scholars Association in major U.S. universities held their First Congress of Chinese Students and Scholars in the United States at the University of Illinois at Chicago. The mission of IFCSS was to promote democracy in China and to protect the interests of the Chinese students and scholars studying in the United States, as a response to Tiananmen Square protests of 1989.

Since its birth, IFCSS has become one of the most influential overseas Chinese students groups in history. It has lobbied successfully in U.S. Congress for many bills including the Chinese Student Protection Act of 1992, organized the well-known Washington March for Chinese Democracy in 1989, and united tens of thousands of Chinese students together for many years since 1989. However, its relevance and importance have been declining for years, even though some of its members continue to organize Memorials for the Tiananmen Square protests of 1989 in Washington, D.C.

The IFCSS was credited as to have started using the Internet for social mobilization and congressional lobbying. Also, IFCSS is widely considered a pioneer in utilizing modern technologies (electronic gadgets) like fax machines and emails to spread truth in totalitarian countries, and to coordinate social protests.

In October 2018, IFCSS become a special topic again, as the Chinese Students and Scholars Association that IFCSS used to represent became a subject in vice president Mike Pence's Oct 2018 policy speech on China.
