= Government-organized non-governmental organization =

Type of organization

A government-organized non-governmental organization (GONGO) is a non-governmental organization that was set up or sponsored by a government in order to further its political interests and mimic the civic groups and civil society at home, or promote its international or geopolitical interests abroad.

== History ==
The term GONGO had become established by the late 1980s, and it was suggested that it was first introduced by a group of Indonesian non-governmental organizations.

However, the concept of a GONGO is much older than the term. For example, the post-WWII West German Minister of Intra-German Relations funded a large number of organisations in the 1950s, including "Eastern Bureaux" (Ostbüros) of political parties, churches and trade unions as well as students' and lawyers' association, setting up what observers called a "shadow administration" to pursue its geopolitical aims during the Cold War.

Most contemporary attempts to understand GONGOs have come from studies of authoritarian contexts, where these organizations have proliferated as a deliberative strategy by the state to have a (corporatist) mechanism that feeds directly into a grassroots civic space. It is thus unsurprising that the current theorizing on the nature of GONGOs primarily highlights their role in undermining liberal democratic values. The Chinese Communist Party's United Front system is a prominent example of such use of GONGOs.

== Goals ==
A GONGO can be created for any sound political or social purpose, however, in reality, it would be functioning as a mechanism of the government to further its domestic political interests and realize its economic and foreign policy objectives. Sometimes, GONGOs are created to solicit international aid, or mitigate specific humanitarian issues. Though not necessarily confined to developing countries, most often, GONGOs are set up by undemocratic governments to maintain some level of control of a GONGO's personnel, purpose, operation or activities. This control is often not seen in a positive light, as it compromises the spirit of an NGO by introducing hidden actors and withholding the government's intentions from the public.

== Examples ==
Examples of non-governmental organizations said to be government-organized:

- Chinese Students and Scholars Association—by the Chinese government.
- IHH (Humanitarian Relief Foundation)—by the Turkish government (specifically under Erdogan).
- National Endowment for Democracy (NED)—by the United States government.
- Polish National Foundation (PFN)—by the government of Poland through the state-owned companies.
- RAIPON—by the Russian government.

== See also ==
- Astroturfing
- Freedom of information
- Gray propaganda
- Quasi-autonomous non-governmental organisation
