= Lars Eklund =

Swedish journalist (born 1953)

- Born: 24 March 1953 (age 73); Sweden
- Education: Lund University (Undergraduate degree in Ethnology, Social anthropology and Arabic language studies); University of Gothenburg (degree in Journalism) (1980)
- Occupations: Journalist, editor
- Spouse: Bubu Eklund
- Relatives: Munshi family (in-laws)

Lars Eklund (born 24 March 1953) is a Swedish journalist specialized in Ethnology, Social anthropology and Arabic language with a central interest in South Asian studies. He served as the deputy director of Swedish South Asian Studies Network (SASNET) affiliated with Lund University. He played the instrumental role to construct the gateway of SASNET through which the expansion of studies on South Asia in Sweden along with other Scandinavian countries have attained a special interest. He was also the editor-in-chief of the political and cultural magazine focused on South Asia named Sydasien from 1982 to 2007. He also served as the sub-editor and night editor of the daily Swedish newspaper Arbetet from 1984 to 2000.

Eklund was one of the board members for the European Conferences for South Asian Studies for which he also held the position of treasurer. To his credit, he conducted the 18th conference of the European Conferences for South Asian Studies in 2004, at the premises of Lund University along with Staffan Lindberg. In 1982, Eklund married Bubu Eklund, daughter of the noted Indian artist Annada Munshi and played a central role to expand Annada Munshi's works in Sweden.

Eklund started the International Tagore Choir in Lund, the first of its kind in Scandinavian nations, along with his wife Bubu Eklund in 2012, through which he is also involved in the significant publicity of Rabindra Sangeet and his ideologies in Sweden.
