= Prokash Karmakar =

Indian artist (1933–2014)

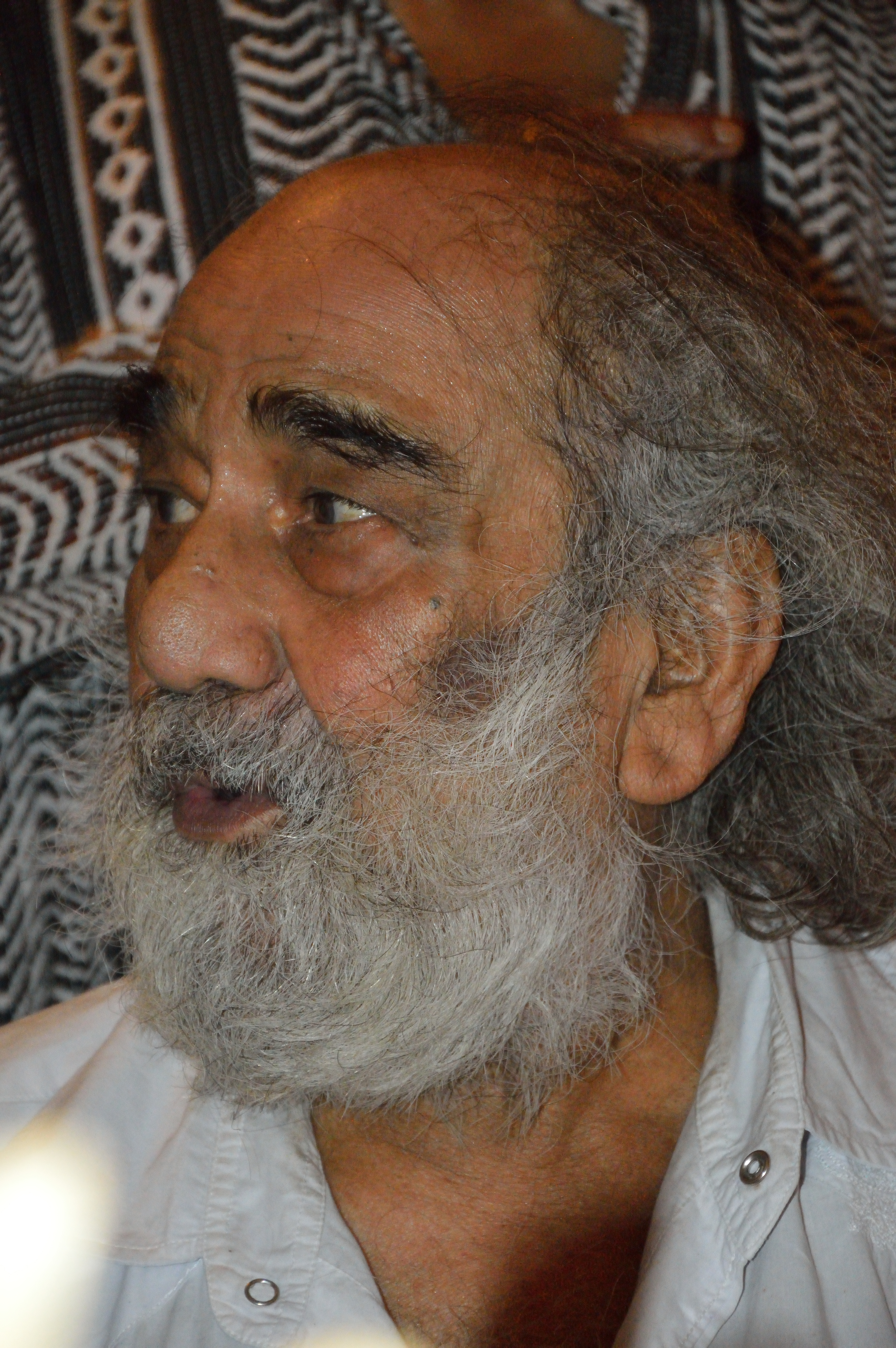
- Prokash Karmakar at Academy of Fine Arts, Kolkata. Oct. 2012.
- Occupation: Painter
- Parent: Prahlad Karmakar
- Website: https://www.prokashkarmakar.com/

Prokash Karmakar (1933 – 24 February 2014) was a preeminent Indian artist from Kolkata, West Bengal. His work is in the permanent collection of a number of museums and galleries throughout India, including the National Gallery of Modern Art, New Delhi and he is the recipient of numerous awards. Karmakar is best known for his landscapes and nudes, which are generally painted in vibrant colors with bold lines and intricate textures. His paintings reflect his perception and interpretation of nature (both orderly and chaotic), life (both rural and urban), and form (from soft to sharp), without reference to religion. The Founder Member of the Society of Contemporary Artist, Kolkata, 1961 and that of the Calcutta Painters group, he has received more than ten prestigious awards between 1957 and 1999, including the Lalit Kala Akademi National Award in 1968 and the Abanindra Puraskar Award in 1999.

Prokash Karmakar's work can be purchased at DAG Modern. and Prokash Karmakar Official Website(https://www.prokashkarmakar.com/)
