= Raghunath Goswami =

Indian artist and graphic designer(1931–1995)

- Born: 13 January 1931; Santragachi, Howrah, British India (present day West Bengal)
- Died: 19 January 1995 (aged 64); Paikapara, Kolkata
- Education: Maharaja Manindra Chandra College (dropped out); Government College of Art and Craft, Calcutta
- Movement: Commercial art, graphic design and modern Indian advertising
- Spouse: Uma Goswami
- Children: Mangal Goswami
- Parent(s): Upendranath Goswami (Father); Ranibala Devi (Mother)

Raghunath Goswami (Bengali: রঘুনাথ গোস্বামী) (13 January 1931 – 19 January 1995) was an Indian Bengali book and graphic designer. Raghunath made India's first puppet film, which won the Prime Minister of India's Gold Medal Award for Best Children's Film. Goswami also painted the covers of many books.

== Career ==
Goswami started his career as a book designer, illustrator and graphic designer. He was also the cover artist of the books. He worked in J. Walter Thompson in the field of designing in advertising. He served as the Art Director in the same company. After that he also worked in Everest Advertising Company. In 1960, he quit his job as a creative art director and started a company called R Goswami & Associates (RGA). In 1952, he founded an organization called The Puppets Calcutta (or Puppets) along with Hena Dasgupta, Dilip Bhowmik and Shantiranjan Pal at Rani Harshmukhi Road in Paikpara, North Kolkata. This organization started the practice of non-traditional puppetry in this country. The Puppets had their office at 6 Hastings Street (now Kiran Shankar Roy Road), Calcutta-1. In 1960, he made a color puppet film called Hattagol Vijay in this way. It is India's first puppet film. The story is also written by Goswami himself. It won the Prime Minister's Gold Medal as the best children's film in 1961.

In Anandabazar Patrika, Angshuman Bandopadhyay wrote under the title 'Those who brought Bengaliana in advertising',

From Annada Munshi to Satyajit Ray, O. C. Ganguly, Makhan Dutta Gupta, Ranen Ayan Dutt or Raghunath Goswami---None is only skilled artist in Advertising. Along with advertising, they brought fine arts, literature, music, films and above all the Bengali heritage. The culture of Calcutta emerged in their work. (in Bengali)

He also designed the cover of Bibhutibhushan Banerjee's novel Ichamati, Kushal Pahari published by Mitra & Ghosh Publishers.

== Death ==
Goswami died on 19 January in 1995.

== Awards ==
- Gold Medal from Prime Minister of India (1961)
- In 1981, he received the Nivedita Art Award from the Ramakrishna-Vivekananda Ashrama (Howrah) in 1981 for creating art based on the Ramakrishna-Vivekananda ideology.
- Academy Award for Puppetry (1993) from the then Governor of West Bengal K. V. Raghunatha Reddy
- In 1994, he was awarded the Mukabhinaya and folk drama award from Sharabhuj organization.

Goswami also received recognition and awards from various organizations.
