= Chinese Students and Scholars Association =

Chinese state-sponsored organization

The Chinese Students and Scholars Association (CSSA; Chinese: 中国学生学者联合(谊)会; pinyin: zhōngguó xuéshēng xuézhě liánhé (liányí) huì) is the official organization for overseas Chinese students and scholars registered in most colleges and universities outside of the People's Republic of China. The associations in different institutions share a common name. The stated function of CSSAs is helping overseas Chinese in their life, study, work, and other issues, bringing Chinese students together on campus, serving as a bridge between Chinese and other communities, and promoting Chinese culture. The groups typically host events such as annual Chinese New Year galas, holiday celebrations, academic forums and talent recruitment competitions tied to the Thousand Talents Plan.

Journalists and human rights groups have described CSSAs as government-organized non-governmental organizations used to surveil and report on Chinese students abroad. According to the United States Department of State, "the CCP created the Chinese Students and Scholars Association (CSSA) to monitor Chinese students and mobilize them against views that dissent from the CCP's stance."

The CSSA started in the late 1970s when China started sending students to study overseas. In August 1989, representatives from over 200 CSSAs gathered in the University of Illinois at Chicago for the First Congress of Chinese Students and Scholars, established their national association as the now-defunct Independent Federation of Chinese Students and Scholars (IFCSS) as a response to the 1989 Tiananmen Square protests and massacre.

== Control and funding ==
A 2018 report by the United States-China Economic and Security Review Commission stated, "[d]espite the useful social services CSSAs provide for their members, they receive guidance from the CCP through Chinese embassies and consulates – governmental ties CSSAs frequently attempt to conceal – and are active in carrying out overseas Chinese work consistent with Beijing's United Front strategy."

The CSSAs are collectively overseen by the Chinese Communist Party's United Front Work Department. Individual CSSAs are sponsored and monitored by Chinese embassy and consular officials, as the Chinese government has a consistent policy toward Chinese students and scholars since the 1990s. In some cases, the local Chinese consulate must approve CSSA presidential candidates. Documents and emails obtained by Foreign Policy in 2018 showed that the Georgetown University CSSA accepted funding from the Chinese embassy in Washington, D.C., which amounted to roughly half its total annual budget.

== Reactions ==
CSSAs have been criticized for trying to control and monitor the speech of Chinese students and professors, and for involvement in espionage in various countries including Canada, Belgium, France, the Netherlands, Germany, and the United Kingdom. Some CSSA branches have also pressured their host universities to cancel talks relating to Tibet, the Chinese democracy movement, Uyghurs, the Hong Kong protests, and the persecution of Falun Gong.

=== Incidents ===
In 2005, a local CSSA in Leuven was reported to be used as a front organization for industrial espionage.

In 2011, Cambridge University disbanded their CSSA chapter after the society's president, Chang Feifan (常非凡), announced that she would enter a second term without election, and refused to provide the university a copy of the society's constitution. Some students and staff alleged that the CSSA was controlled by the Chinese embassy, and that the embassy had advised the CSSA president to continue her reign without holding an election.

In 2015, Columbia University briefly shuttered its CSSA chapter after violations of multiple financial and student organizational policies.

In 2016, President of the Australian National University CSSA chapter Tao Binru publicly confronted the university pharmacy for stocking The Epoch Times, a newspaper known for its opposition to the Chinese Communist Party. The pharmacist claimed to be intimidated by Tao's body language and allowed him to throw out the newspapers. The previous year, Tao had told Chinese media that, "'What [Chinese students] day and night long for is the 'China Dream' that General Secretary Xi Jinping speaks of – serving the rejuvenation of the nation and the people with unremitting efforts. Even though our bodies are overseas, our hearts are tied to the Motherland'."

In a 2017 New York Times article, chapters of CSSA were described as having "worked in tandem with Beijing to promote a pro-Chinese agenda and tamp down anti-Chinese speech on Western campuses." The University of California, San Diego chapter protested the university's decision to invite the 14th Dalai Lama to speak at its 2017 commencement.

In 2017, the Wayne State University chapter of the CSSA reportedly funneled money from the Chinese consulate to finance a trip to China for the mayor of Ypsilanti, Michigan and three officials. The same year, the CSSA chapter at the University of Maryland attacked a commencement speech delivered by a Chinese student, which praised freedom of speech, following similar criticism of the speech by Chinese state media.

CSSAs became a subject in vice president Mike Pence's October 2018 policy speech on China.

In 2019, Human Rights Watch called for closer monitoring of CSSAs in response to threats to academic freedom. In 2019, the CSSA chapter at McMaster University accused a local Uyghur-Canadian activist of fomenting "separatism" after her speech drawing attention to human rights violations in Xinjiang. The CSSA chapter subsequently had its status as a student organization revoked since its coordination with the PRC consulate was deemed a violation of student club rules.

In 2020, Canada's National Security and Intelligence Committee of Parliamentarians stated that the CSSAs "behavior may also pose a threat to freedom of speech and assembly." The same year, the CSSA chapter at Brandeis University organized to shut down a panel on the Uyghur genocide.

In 2021, Human Rights Watch published a report documenting instances of CSSAs being used to monitor Chinese university students abroad.

In 2022, the president of George Washington University reversed a decision to remove posters by Chinese political cartoonist Badiucao critical of the 2022 Winter Olympics following initial complaints by the local CSSA chapter. In 2023, Chinese international students at George Washington University formed an independent alternative to the local CSSA chapter called Torch on the Potomac.

In July 2023, Hong Kong students and human rights activists protested the CSSA at the University of Queensland.

In December 2023, a group of Republican lawmakers asked the United States Department of Justice to assess whether the Foreign Agents Registration Act (FARA) applies to CSSAs in the United States.

In May 2024, the CSSA at the University of Florida protested a law signed by Ron DeSantis barring Chinese students from working in certain academic labs without special permission. The same year, John Moolenaar, chairman of the United States House Select Committee on Strategic Competition between the United States and the Chinese Communist Party, criticized Harvard University for failing to discipline a CSSA-affiliated student who physically removed a student protester at a speaking event for Chinese Ambassador Xie Feng.

In March 2026, several U.S. lawmakers asked Marco Rubio to designate CSSAs in the United States as "foreign missions".

== See also ==
- Overseas censorship of Chinese issues
- Transnational repression by China
- United Front Work Department
