= Annada Munsi =

Indian artist (1905–1985)

Annada Munshi
- Born: 27 November 1905; Born Annada Munshi; Shibnagar, Pabna, Bengal Presidency, British India (present day Bangladesh)
- Died: 14 January 1985 (aged 79); Paikpara, Calcutta, West Bengal, India
- Education: Government College of Art and Craft, Calcutta
- Known for: Painting and calligraphy
- Notable work: Tea is 100% Swadeshi; Tea Fights Fatigue; Lord Gouranga Travels
- Movement: Commercial art and modern Indian advertising
- Spouse: Jayati Munshi
- Children: 9, including Manto Munshi and Bubu Eklund
- Parent(s): Anukul Charan Munshi (father); Pranmohini Devi (mother)
- Relatives: Banwari Munshi (grandfather); Amulya Munshi (half uncle); Manu Munshi (half-brother); Pallabi Munsi (granddaughter)
- Family: Extended Munshi family of Kadirpara and Chougachi

Annada Munshi (transliterated as Annada Munsi; 27 November 1905 – 14 January 1985) was an Indian painter, designer, calligrapher, draughtsman, musicologist, writer and a noted figure of modern advertising in India. He is credited with demolishing British monopoly in the field of modern Indian advertising establishing Swadeshi culture instead. He was widely recognised as the finest layout artist in the country during his era. A pioneer of commercial design in India, he is considered as the undisputable Father of Commercial Art in India.

== Birth and education ==
Munshi was born in Shibnagar, Pabna of Bengal Presidency (present day in Bangladesh) to renowned artist Anukul Munshi and Pranmohini Devi in the Munshi family on 27 November 1905. His grandfather Babu Banwari Charan Munshi was the zamindar of Chougachi. He was educated at Nakail Raicharan Institute and Pathartala Aryan Academy of Pabna. While in Pabna, Munshi became involved in the Indian independence movement, influenced by Mahatma Gandhi’s principles of Nonviolent resistance. Known for his singing ability, he used to perform Vande Mataram and Allāhu ʾAkbar in villages under the leadership of Indian National Congress leaders Prabhash Lahiri and Naresh Lahiri. He received training in mother-of-pearl art from his father, Anukul Munshi, at the Chougachi Mother-of-Pearl Factory, which his father had established. He accompanied his father annually to sell mother-of-pearl artefacts at the Harihar Chhatrer Mela and at the Maidan in Calcutta. According to Anandagopal Sengupta, Munshi was a childhood friend of Mohammad Ali Bogra, the third Prime Minister of Pakistan, as his father served as the Dewan to the Nawab of Bogra. Later, he relocated to Calcutta to attend the Government Art School (now Government College of Art and Craft).

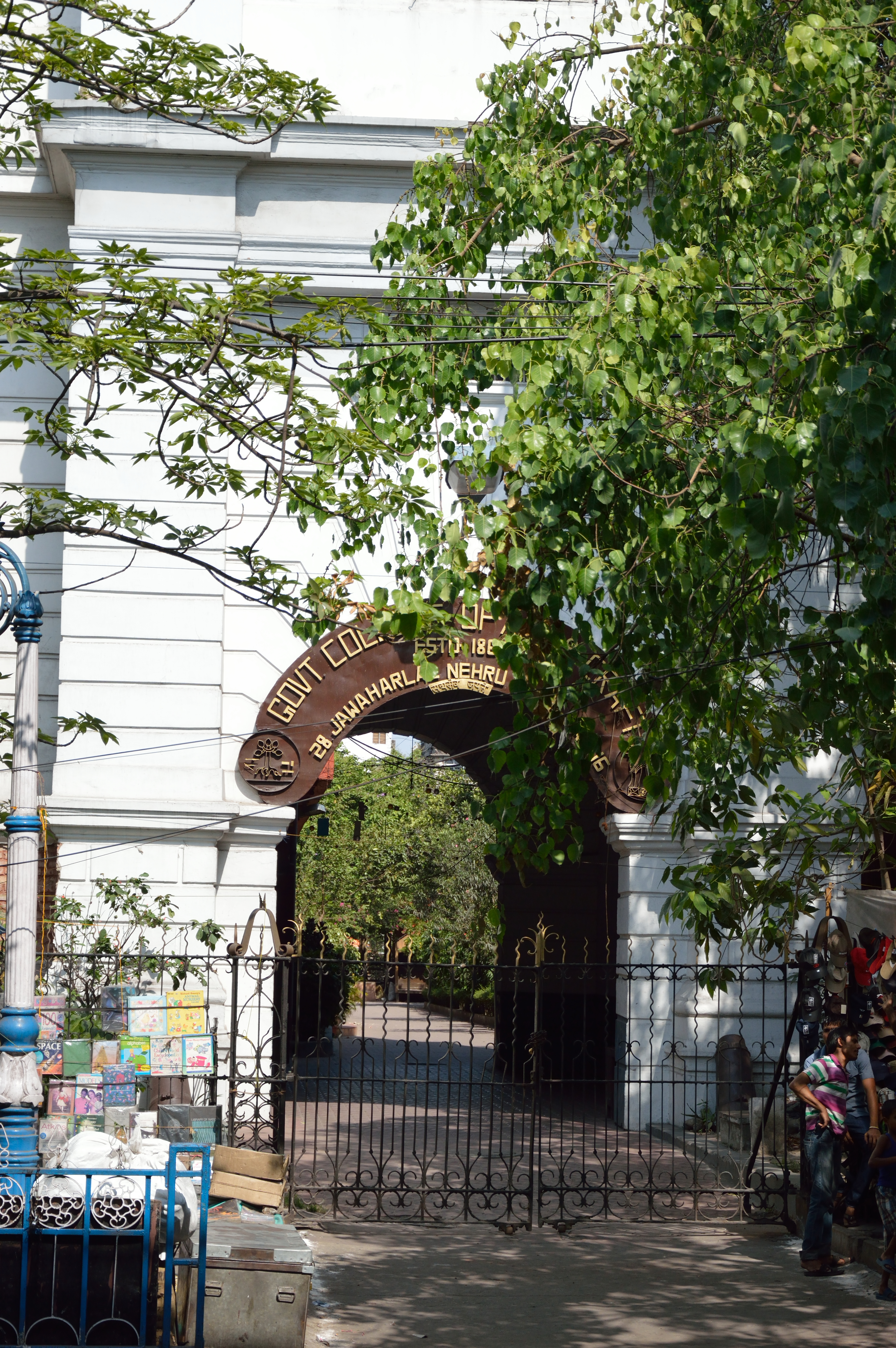
Entrance of Government College of Art & Craft (then known as Government Art School), Chowringhee Road, Kolkata, where Munshi was educated for some time

== Career ==
Munshi started his career at the Army Navy Stores in Calcutta as a Shepherd designer. Then he moved to Bombay (present day Mumbai) in 1930. There, he started working in the Times of India's advertising department. In addition to this employment, he used to sing Swadeshi Jagaran at Prabhat Ferry and also Rabindra Sangeet at Aakashvani's Bombay centre once in a month. Along with being a skilled commercial artist, he also excelled in fine arts and sketching scenes for films. As a result of his success, he was appointed as a visualiser by the global advertising agency "DJ Keymer" and came back to Calcutta in 1935. Here he mentored his the then assistant Satyajit Ray, along with O. C. Ganguly, Raghunath Goswami, Makhan Dutta Gupta and so on. Here, he became especially well-known for his notable works in tea board (for example, Tea is 100% Swadeshi and Tea Fights Fatigue), and railway advertisings (for example, Lord Gouranga Travels). In 1948, again he was appointed as the Art Director of a Mumbai-based Advertising agency called Sisters' Limited and relocated in Mumbai. He retired as the Art Director of Publicity Forum in Kolkata where he mentored noted commercial artists like Ranen Ayan Dutt and Ahibhusan Malik.

== Contributions in Indian advertising ==
Appointed as the Art Director of D. J. Keymer, Munshi introduced Bangaliana (Bengali culture) into advertising. He excelled in the advertisements of Indian Tea Market Expansion Board and Railways. He first conceived the idea that train travel could make it much easier to reach places once visited on foot by great spiritual leaders through long and difficult journeys. He incorporated depictions of prominent religious figures such as Shri Chaitanya, Swami Vivekananda and Lord Buddha into railway advertisements based on this idea. In campaigns for the Tea Board, he employed indigenous narrative and folk-style illustrations, including designs inspired by the traditional pattachitra paintings of Bengal. His work also incorporated rhymes and ritual narratives associated with festivals and vows, an approach not previously used in advertising. He adapted excerpts from the poetry of Rabindranath Tagore for tea advertisements. He was the first Indian artist to use a photograph of his wife Jayati Devi, rather than that of a professional model, in a commercial context, which was an unconventional and pioneering practice for that period.

== Notable works in advertising ==
Some of Munshi's notable works are:

- Tea is 100% Swadeshi (1947): Created in the year of Indian independence, this poster by Munshi promoted tea as an indigenous product instead of a colonial one. Munshi removed imperial symbols and used the Gandhian spinning wheel as the main emblem, which depicted the rejection of imperial associations with tea. The poster blended nationalist imagery with an inspiration from Jamini Roy's Kalighat-style pat painting.

Philip Lutgendorf, noted American scholar of South Asia and Professor Emeritus of Hindi and Modern Indian Studies at the University of Iowa, wrote:

“.....Another remarkable Annada Munshi poster, dated to the year of Independence, presciently heralds this transition: borrowing elements of traditional Kalighat ‘Pat’ painting and the primitive modernism of Bengali artist Jamini Roy (1887-1972), it presents a chaste, sari-clad ‘mother India’, seated behind the iconic charkha (spinning wheel) of Gandhian homespun, enjoying a cup of tea, against a field of little cups-and-saucers and wheels, and above the triumphant announcement – contra much nationalist discourse of the preceding half-century – that tea was now 100 per cent ‘indigenous’ (swadeshi) and hence okay to drink.”

- Tea Fights Fatigue (1948)
- Lord Gouranga Travels

== Style of painting ==
Munshi also invented the technique of using rubber solution in his paintings along with various colour combinations. The principal characteristics of his paintings were simplicity and brightness which even grabbed the attention of Pablo Picasso, renowned Spanish painter and sculptor. Some of his paintings acquired place within personal collections of Pandit Ravi Shankar and Yehudi Menuhin.

== Literary works ==
In 1978, the book named Crucified India (in Bengali accent: Krushbiddha Bharat) authored by Munshi, which was dedicated to his junior and colleague Satyajit Ray, was published.

== Death ==
Munshi died at the age of 79 on 14 January 1985 at Paikpara, Kolkata, India.
