= Manu Munsi =

Indian Mother-of-Pearl artist (1924–2009)

- মনু মুন্সী
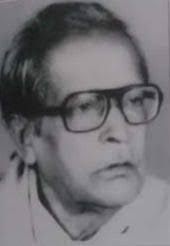
- Born: 2 August 1924; Born Manu Munshi (Manomohan Munshi); Jessore, British India (present day Bangladesh)
- Died: 20 February 2009 (aged 84); Bediapara, Dum Dum, Kolkata
- Education: Government College of Art and Craft, Calcutta
- Known for: Painting and sculpture
- Notable work: Gandhiji's Noakhali Expedition; Indira Gandhi; Nur Jahan
- Movement: Mother-of-Pearl art
- Spouse: Maya Munshi
- Children: 3
- Parent(s): Anukul Charan Munshi (father); Nirmala Devi (mother)
- Relatives: Banwari Munshi (grandfather); Amulya Munshi (half uncle); Annada Munshi (half brother); Jayati Munshi (sister-in-law); Pratip Munshi (cousin); Kumkum Munshi (half nephew); Manto Munshi (half nephew); Bubu Eklund (half niece)
- Family: Extended Munshi family of Kadirpara and Chougachi

Manu Munsi, also spelt as Manu Munshi or Monu Munshi (Bengali: মনু মুন্সী), born as Manomohan Munshi (2 August 1924 – 20 February 2009), was an Indian painter and sculptor known for his works on Indian Mother-of-pearl art during the mid-to-end of the 20th century. Some of his works in mother of pearl include Gandhiji's Noakhali Expedition, Indira Gandhi and Nur Jahan.

Apart from the Mother-of-pearl artworks and sculptures, he also created wire sculptures in Bengal included Rabindranath Tagore, Kazi Nazrul Islam, Swami Vivekananda, Mahatma Gandhi, Bhagat Singh. Some of his works are held in the personal collections of Bidhan Chandra Roy, the former Chief Minister of West Bengal and Satyajit Ray. He also portrayed Tagore in various poses engraved on metal plates.

== Birth and family background ==
Munsi was born in Jessore on 2 August in 1924 to Mother-of-pearl artist Anukul Charan Munshi who is called the Father of Indian Mother-of-Pearl artistry. His elder brother was Annada Munshi who is called the Father of Commercial Art in India according to some art critics.

== Initial days and education ==
Munshi, after finishing his matriculation, started working as a novice in the studio of painter Prahlad Karmakar in Calcutta. His elder brother Annada encouraged him to attend the then Government Art School (present day Government College of Art and Craft) in Calcutta.

== Career ==
Munshi began his career with J. Walter Thompson, India, inspired by Annada Munshi and film-director Rajen Tarafdar. But, during the course of his career, he felt that the commercial art was not for him and resigned. Later he joined the Government Arts and Craft Board and ended up resigning from there too. He became a permanent part of the All India Handicrafts Board before his retirement as a senior artist.

== Accolades ==
- Munshi's most accomplished work in Mother-of-pearl is Gandhiji's Noakhali Expedition which was hand-picked by the then Chief Minister of West Bengal Bharat Ratna Bidhan Chandra Roy as the Best representative of Charu and Karu Art of Bengal and was sent to the United States for public exhibition.
- In 1972, Munshi received a certificate of merit from the Rabindra Bharati University.
- In 1986, Munshi was nominated for Padmashri.

== Selected works ==
Some of his Mother-of-Pearl artworks are Gandhiji's Noakhali Expedition, Indira Gandhi (1985) and Nur Jahan. He also portrayed Tagore in a variety of stances etched on metal plates. Among his wire sculptures and portraits, some examples are Rabindranath Tagore, Kazi Nazrul Islam, Swami Vivekananda, Mahatma Gandhi, Sarat Chandra Chattopadhyay and Bhagat Singh. In 1985, Satyajit Ray wrote about Manu Munshi's Mother-of-pearl piece titled Indira Gandhi:

"I have seen the mother-of-pearl portrait of Smt. Gandhi done by Shri Manu Munshi. I find it of excellent quality."

== Patrons ==
During his entire career as an art activist, Munshi was patronized by many personalities of the same era including his own elder brother Annada Munshi, Satyajit Ray, Barrister Subodh Chandra Roy, Bidhan Chandra Roy, Subho Tagore, Hiranmay Bandopadhyay, Rajen Tarafdar, Humayun Kabir and Jehangir Kabir. His paternal name was 'Manomohan Munshi'. Later, the then Chief Minister of Bengal, Dr. Bidhan Chandra Roy shortened his name to 'Manu'.

== Personal life ==
Munshi was married to Maya Bose (later Maya Munshi) whose family was from Khannyan of Hooghly of West Bengal. The couple has three sons.

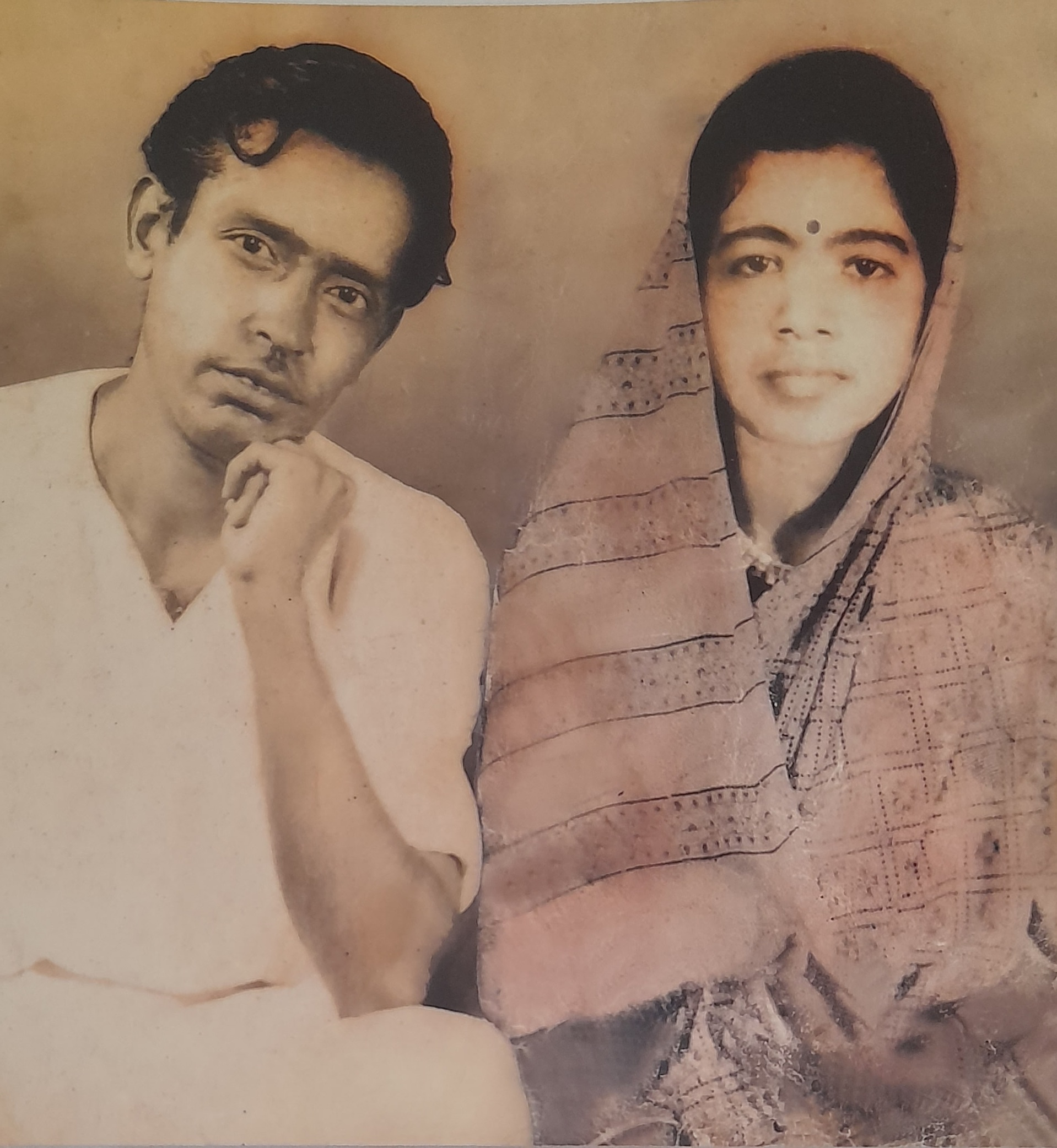
Munshi with his wife Maya

== Demise ==
On 20 February 2009, Munshi died at Bediapara, Dum Dum in Kolkata.

== Legacy ==
After the death of Munshi, Santanu Ghosh wrote about his life in the books Binodane Paikpara Belgachia (in Bengali: বিনোদনে পাইকপাড়া বেলগাছিয়া) and Munshianay Chollis Purush (in Bengali: মুন্সিয়ানায় চল্লিশ পুরুষ).

In 2024 June, in honor of Munshi's centenary birth anniversary, a documentary film titled Excellence of Munshis in Arts (in Bengali: শিল্পে মুন্সীদের মুন্সিয়ানা) was released which was directed by Partho Mukherjee based on research by Munshi's youngest son artist Amitava Munshi.
