= Bubu Eklund =

Bengali singer (born 1951)

- Portrait, Sydsvenskan
- Born: Bubu Munshi; 11 March 1951; Paikpara, Kolkata, West Bengal, India
- Education: Rabindra Bharati University
- Occupations: Singer, exponent of Rabindra Sangeet
- Spouse: Lars Eklund
- Parents: Annada Munshi (father); Jayati Munshi (mother)
- Relatives: Manto Munshi (brother); Manu Munsi (half-uncle)

Bubu Eklund (née Munshi, born: 11 March 1951) is an Indian-born Swedish singer and exponent of Rabindra Sangeet. She is based in Lund and leads the Lund International Tagore Choir with her husband Lars Eklund, which is involved in popularising Rabindra Sangeet and the ideologies of Rabindranath Tagore in Sweden. She is the daughter of Indian painter and commercial artist Annada Munsi. Eklund is known for her series of concerts titled A Swedish View of Rabindranath Tagore, along with Per Olov Henricson.

== Biography ==
Eklund was born in a Bengali family, the daughter of painter and commercial artist Annada Munsi. She attended the Rabitirtha Institute in Kolkata, India, as a student of Rabindra Sangeet exponents Suchitra Mitra and Kanika Bandopadhyay.

According to Riyanka Roy of The Indian Express,

“Bubu was already an accomplished exponent of Rabindrasangeet, having trained under two of the most revered figures in Tagore’s musical tradition, Suchitra Mitra and Kanika Bandyopadhyay, whose guidance shaped both her artistic grounding and interpretive depth."

Eklund started the International Tagore Choir in Lund with her husband Lars Eklund in 2012, where Swedish people are trained to sing Rabindra Sangeet. She lives in Lund, Sweden from 1983 with her husband Lars Eklund.

According to a feature published in The Telegraph (India) in 2015, Hindol Sengupta (former Editor-at-Large, Fortune India) and Andreas Mattsson (Lecturer in Media Studies, Lund University),

“It was in 2012 that the couple inaugurated their "other dream project" - a Swedish Rabindrasangeet choir. It now has 15 members, comprising an Indian and a Bangladeshi, but the rest all Swedes. The choir has performed at many concerts in Lund and also Uppsala, where a Tagore statue was unveiled at the university in 2013."

== Performances ==
- Performance at Lund Cathedral to commemorate Mother Teresa after her demise in 1997
- Performance at the Nobel Prize Museum at Stockholm in 2002 in the presence of Chitra Narayanan, the former Ambassador of India to Sweden
- The Lund concert on the occasion of Tagore's 150th Birth Anniversary in 2011
- Performance in Uppsala University on the occasion of Tagore's 150th Birth Anniversary in 2011 in the presence of AFM Gousal Azam Sarker, Former Ambassador of Bangladesh to Sweden and Ashok Sajjanhar, Former Ambassador of India to Sweden
- The India Tour in 2013: Performances in Star Theatre, Kolkata, Sangit Bhavana of Visva-Bharati University, Shakuntala Rheumatology Hospital and Research Institute in Balasore, North Orissa University and IIT Kharagpur.
- The Stockholm concert in 2014 on the celebration of 100 years of Tagore's Nobel Prize winning
- The Bangladesh Tour in 2023

In 2013 the choir toured West Bengal and Odisha, performing at Calcutta’s Star Theatre alongside Mamata Shankar’s troupe and at Santiniketan’s Sangit Bhavana for students and faculty.
