= Yang Rui =

Chinese journalist

Yang Rui (simplified Chinese: 杨锐; traditional Chinese: 楊銳; pinyin: Yáng Ruì; born 2 May 1963) is a Chinese journalist, who formerly hosted the Dialogue talk show on CGTN.

In addition to academics and China experts, Yang interviews a wide variety of opinion makers including prominent politicians, diplomats and business people.

Yang is known for his aggressive and impolite approach to interviewing, giving a negative impression to foreigners. He is also notorious for his personal attacks on other people and journalists.

In May 2020, after six months off-air, Yang left CGTN to join TMTPOST, a Chinese news website.

== Background ==
Yang Rui was born in Jilin City but spent much of his childhood in Mudanjiang, Heilongjiang. From 1980 to 1986 he attended Shanghai International Studies University, where he received degrees in American/English Literature and International News. He began his career as a journalist with China National Radio. For two decades, he was the presenter of Dialogue, an English language political talk show on CGTN (previously CCTV-9 and CCTV News). Foreign guests appear frequently.

Yang Rui's on-camera personality is characterized by China expert David Shambaugh as "an aggressive (often impolite) male interviewer" who "often gives a negative and nationalistic image to foreign viewers" and "badgers and is often offensive to on-camera guests". Asked in an interview why this was so, Rui answered "Hard politics, hard talk".

== Comments on foreign citizens in China ==
On 16 May 2012, Yang made comments on Sina Weibo criticising some foreign citizens and journalists in China, including Melissa Chan of Al Jazeera English, who was effectively expelled from the country. Yang's statement occurred during an official Chinese government campaign to identify illegal foreign residents in China. Yang's full posting (translated from Mandarin by The Wall Street Journal) was:

The Public Security Bureau wants to clean out the foreign trash: To arrest foreign thugs and protect innocent girls, they need to concentrate on the disaster zones in [student district] Wudaokou and [drinking district] Sanlitun. Cut off the foreign snake heads. People who can’t find jobs in the U.S. and Europe come to China to grab our money, engage in human trafficking and spread deceitful lies to encourage emigration. Foreign spies seek out Chinese girls to mask their espionage and pretend to be tourists while compiling maps and GPS data for Japan, Korea and the West. We kicked out that foreign bitch and closed Al-Jazeera’s Beijing bureau. We should shut up those who demonize China and send them packing.

Yang released a statement on 21 May 2012 defending his comments and seeking to correct supposed mischaracterisations of his message and the English translation of "foreign bitch" instead of "foreign shrew".

Next Media Animation responded to China CCTV's Yang Rui comments posted on his Sina Weibo account. Repercussion of Yang's comments has been an outcry to boycott his Dialogue show. Charlie Custer from the website ChinaGeeks, who had previously been a guest on Mr. Rui's show, stated, "I would strongly suggest that foreigners boycott CCTV Dialogue and decline any future invitations." Another former guest, James Fallows of The Atlantic Monthly, also called on invitees of the show to decline their invitations.

== Antisemitism ==
On 24 May 2012, The Atlantic Monthly's James Fallows quoted more controversial comments, discovered by Shanghaiist, an online Chinese news discussion board, that had been made by Yang Rui on his Sina Weibo account. Rui accused the United States media of not supporting the Palestinian cause and alleged that they were afraid of "getting fired by their Jewish bosses."

The complete statement included a passage saying:

"The media and the republic go up and down together. The US has done this to the extreme, but Wall Street's greed was not exposed because Jews control both the financial and media worlds. Why do the US media not dare to support the call for the establishment of a Palestinian state? It's because they're afraid of getting fired by their Jewish bosses. When I interviewed the chairman of the US Jewish Association, I questioned him on this. He snarled at me ferociously and said that in America, no one would dare to speak to him this way. He was like a mafia chief. So please stop saying how beautiful American press freedom is."

This statement has been characterised as antisemitic.
