= Ranen Ayan Dutt =

Indian artist (1927–2024)

- Born: 24 November 1927; Sylhet, British India (now Bangladesh)
- Died: 3 March 2024 (aged 96); Kolkata, West Bengal, India
- Education: Government College of Art & Craft, Calcutta
- Known for: Painting
- Movement: Swadeshi art movement of Bengal

Ranen Ayan Dutt (November 24, 1927 – March 3, 2024) was an Indian painter, illustrator, muralist, and graphic designer from Kolkata in West Bengal.

== Early life ==
Dutt was born in Sylhet, British India (currently Bangladesh), into a Hindu Kayastha family. His father, Rajanimohan Dutt, was a freedom fighter and a teacher at Sanskrit College, Kolkata; his mother, Priyobala, was a homemaker. At an early age, Dutt started with pre-partition Bengal, drawing inspiration from Abanindranath Tagore and Jamini Roy. Following his matriculation, he enrolled at the art college in Kolkata in 1942, graduating from Government College of Art & Craft, Kolkata with first-class honours in Fine Arts in 1948. Among his teachers were painters Zainul Abedin, Atul Bose, Ramendranath Chakraborti, and Anwarul Huq. Upon completing his studies, Dutt met Annada Munsi, through whom he entered the field of commercial art, working briefly at Munsi's studio, Prakashika. He was also associated with filmmaker Satyajit Ray, who had likewise been trained and mentored by Munsi.

== Career ==
After graduating, Dutt joined Stronachs India as an art director in Bombay (now Mumbai). On his return to Kolkata, he joined J Walter Thompson (JWT) as its Chief Art Director. Over two decades, he created several campaigns and promotional material for brands like Tea Board, Tata Steel, Jabakusum and Shalimar hair oil, as well as the campaign Made for Each Other for Wills's Cigarettes.

In 1957, Dutt designed book covers and posters for Bengali cinema, including Tapan Sinha's Kabuliwala and Ajoy Kar's Harano Sur. In 1967, he designed posters for Arundhati Devi's Chhuti.

In 1974, Dutt started his own firm, R.A.D. Associates, to expand his work in architectural and museum design.

Dutt designed pavilions and murals for Tata Steel, Tea Board, and Steel Authority of India. He created a commercial pavilion in 1972 for Asia1972 festival, which drew the attention of Indira Gandhi, who was then Prime Minister of India. The Bengal pavilion later became a permanent structure at Delhi. Landmarks such as the Air India Building in Mumbai, Exide Industries, and the Indian Institute of Coal Management in Ranchi also bear Dutt's aesthetic imprint. He further contributed to the archives of the local head office of the State Bank of India at Stand Road, Kolkata.

In addition, Dutt designed the Shipping Transport Museum (the first floating maritime museum on the Ganges), the Earth Science Museum, and the Steel Museum in Durgapur.

=== Fine art ===
Alongside his commercial work, Dutt maintained a career as a fine artist, creating paintings, murals, graphics, calendar art, and watercolors that often depicted Kolkata's cityscape and everyday life. Among his more notable sketches are "Trafalgar Square" and "Darjeeling Station", as well as scenes of London city life.

Dutt's work was featured in several exhibitions, including a 50-painting display at the Ramakrishna Mission Institute of Culture in 2015. This was followed by a retrospective at Galerie88 in Kolkata in 2016. His first verified exhibition abroad was at Dag New York in 2021, in two group shows, titled as Indian Blue: From Realism to Abstraction. He is not known to have held any solo exhibitions during his active career.

Dutt sought to revive interest in Indian mythology, folklore, and cultural history through his figurative drawings, landscapes, and commercial designs. For instance, his depictions of the Gangasagar Mela scene and his illustrations for the Katha Sarit Sagar series were incorporated into his advertisements for Shalimar hair oil. In an interview, he noted:

I had no knowledge of western art. My art is swadeshi. My commercial art is inspired by deshi galpo (folk tales), such as the stories of Kunchbaran Kesh Raj Kanya (the princes with long dark hair).

== Recognition ==
Dutt was awarded a D. Litt by Rabindra Bharati University in 1999 for his contribution to Applied Art. He was furthermore a member of the Bengal chapter of the Art Society of India.

== Personal life and death ==
Dutt married Hillola, the daughter of Umashankar Datta, a distinguished criminal lawyer of Silchar, Assam in 1954. The couple resided at Dover Lane, Ballygunge, Kolkata. He painted regularly until his nineties. He was admitted on March 3, 2024 to a nursing home for respiratory problems but died later that night. He was survived by his wife and two daughters.

== Legacy ==
CSSSC, a social science and humanities research and teaching institute in Kolkata, acknowledged Dutt by showcasing various selected artworks in its 2025 commemorative calendar based on the visual archives of the Jadunath Bhavan Museum and Resource Centre (JBMRC), a unit of CSSSC. Dutt's artworks for a 1961 Philips India Ltd calendar on "Boats and Ships" were featured in the calendar.
