= Ursula Gauthier =

French journalist

- Born: Ursula Gauthier
- Occupation: Journalist
- Employer: L'Obs
- Known for: Getting expelled from China

Ursula Gauthier is a French journalist and sinologist. Gauthier was a reporter in China for L'Obs. In December 2015, her visa was not renewed and she was forced to leave the country after she published an article about Uyghurs in Xinjiang which Chinese government officials disapproved of. A Chinese government Foreign Ministry spokesman suggested Gauthier's article "openly supports terrorist activity, the killing of innocents and has outraged the Chinese public."

== Personal ==
Ursula Gauthier is a long time journalist that was working as a foreign correspondent for the French news organization L'Obs in China before she was expelled from the country in December 2015 for an article she wrote about the treatment of Uighurs in China. She was writing on Chinese police killing several Uighur people in Xinjiang which she claimed included women and children, all of whom they said were linked to an attack on a coal mine that happened in September. The controversy arose when Gauthier claimed that "abuse, injustice, expropriation" of Uighurs "probably" triggered retribution in the form of the mass slaughter at the coal mine. Gauthier claimed that many experts doubt that ETIM, the jihadist Uighur East Turkestan Islamic Movement accused by the Chinese government to be the organizer of all violent attacks in Xinjiang, poses any real threat inside China and that some experts deny ETIM's existence. She claimed that ETIM is not classified anymore as terrorist by the USA.

== Career ==
Gauthier had spent six years reporting for L'Obs from Beijing before she was forced to leave.

=== Expulsion from China ===
Gauthier wrote an article about the Chinese leaders' reaction to the November 2015 Paris attacks that was released on November 18, 2015, titled "After the attacks, the solidarity of China is not without ulterior motives."

She was accused of supporting terrorism by Chinese officials and Chinese state media, such as the Global Times and China Daily, after her article was seen as being critical of the ruling class and their handling of Xinjiang Muslims.

After these accusations, the press credentials of Gauthier were effectively revoked, and as a result of this so was her visa, and she was given the choice to either leave China before January 1, 2016, or apologize to the people of China. She ended up leaving China before the start of the new year.

==== Impact ====
Gauthier was the first foreign journalist to be expelled from China since Melissa Chan of Al Jazeera in 2012. According to Gauthier, her being expelled from China was a scare tactic by the Chinese government to dissuade foreign journalists from criticizing Chinese policies, especially those involving Xinjiang, from within China. China's decision to expel Ursula Gauthier contributed to the country's low ranking on the Press Freedom Index.

==== Reactions ====
News organizations from all over the world have reported Gauthier's expulsion from China from The New York Times to Al Jazeera in Qatar. French journalists and press executives published a collective open letter condemning her expulsion. Most reactions from journalists and news organizations alike were not in favor of the Chinese government's decision to expel Ursula Gauthier. The Committee to Protect Journalists released the results from the Foreign Correspondents Club of China's annual survey results. The survey assessed the amount of trouble (such as how easy it is to gain access to certain areas, or how quickly a journalist receives her or his Chinese visa) that foreign journalist face while trying to report on stories going on in China. The survey concluded that the treatment of Ursula Gauthier by the Chinese government, and the Chinese press, which resulted in death threats and personal attacks, were comparable to abuse.

== See also ==
- Melissa Chan

== Bibliography ==
- Vent et poussière (Paris: Editions Denoël, 1995, 368 pages).
- Le Volcan chinois : dans les entrailles du Grand Dragon (Paris: Editions Denoël, 1998, 304 pages).
