= The Three Ts =

Politically sensitive topics in China

The Three Ts in the context of the People's Republic of China are Taiwan, Tibet, and the Tiananmen protests and massacre of 1989.

== Overview ==
The political status of Taiwan (particularly discussion of Taiwanese independence), the Tibetan sovereignty debate, and the 1989 Tiananmen Square protests and massacre are considered extremely politically sensitive by the government of China. Foreigners are advised not to raise these topics with Chinese citizens as this could put them in an "uncomfortable" situation.

Journalist Eveline Chao said that she was told to avoid stories about the Three Ts when working in China.

Academics at British Universities have faced pressure to avoid the Three Ts and praise the Chinese Communist Party (CCP). They were threatened with the cancellation of their Chinese visas which would have ended their ability to do research in China.

== Variants ==
=== The Two Ts ===
For businesses only two of the three Ts are generally relevant, Tibet and Taiwan. Foreign companies operating in China must be careful to avoid appearing to violate the party line on either topic.

=== The Three Ts and Two Cs ===
The Three Ts and Two Cs is an alternate formulation with the same Three Ts with the addition of "cults" (a euphemism for Falun Gong) and "criticism" of the CCP.

== See also ==
- Chinese censorship abroad
- Censorship in China
- Five Poisons
