= Washington March for Chinese Democracy =

1992 rally in Washington, D.C.

The Washington March for Democracy in China was sponsored by the Independent Federation of Chinese Students and Scholars on October 1, 1989, as a response to the 1989 Tiananmen Square protests and massacre. About 6000 people participated. The event's organizers and advisors include Arthur Miller. Father Dryner, president of Georgetown University Law School, Senator Slade Gorton, Congressman Walter E. Fauntroy and many other leaders spoke and participated in the March.
