= Shuping Yang commencement speech controversy =

2017 Chinese student graduation speech

Shuping Yang and University of Maryland president Wallace Loh at the spring commencement on May 21, 2017

The Shuping Yang commencement speech controversy took place following a commencement speech made by Shuping Yang (Chinese: 杨舒平; pinyin: Yáng Shūpíng), a Chinese undergraduate student graduating from the University of Maryland (UMD), on May 21, 2017. The speech, which praised freedom of speech and democracy, drew the ire of Chinese netizens, state media, as well as the Chinese Students and Scholars Association at the University of Maryland.

== Event ==
The commencement ceremony was held at the Xfinity Center on Sunday, May 21, 2017, for the awarding of 6,051 bachelor's degrees, 1,732 master's degrees, and 585 doctoral degrees to the class of 2017. The commencement included speeches by university president Wallace Loh, businessman and UMD alumnus Mark Ciardi, Shuping Yang, and fellow graduate Gregory Ridgway.

During Yang's speech, she contrasted air quality in China with that of the US, using difference in air quality as a metaphor for her feelings toward freedom of speech and democracy. She described her surprise at seeing a performance of Twilight: Los Angeles, 1992, a one-woman play in which topics of racism, sexism, and politics were openly discussed; she had previously been convinced that this was not possible, as she had believed that "only authorities owned the narrative". She further mentioned student protests, the election in 2016, and the voting system of the United States. Her speech ended with the passage:

"Democracy and free speech should not be taken for granted. Democracy and freedom are the fresh air that is worth fighting for. Freedom is oxygen. Freedom is passion. Freedom is love. And as a French philosopher Jean-Paul Sartre once said, 'freedom is a choice.' Our future is dependent on the choices we make, today and tomorrow. We are all playwrights of the next chapters of our lives. Together we write the human history. My friends, enjoy the fresh air and never ever let it go."

After the speech, university president Wallace Loh, a native of Shanghai, returned to the lectern on the verge of tears and commented, "[the speech] was most inspiring. And like you and your parents, I also am an American by choice, and you have expressed some of the deepest feelings I feel for this country."

== Reactions ==
=== Chinese Students and Scholars Association ===
The speech stirred a sharp reaction among students in the Chinese community of the University of Maryland, notably from members of the pro-government Chinese Students and Scholars Association (CSSA). The CSSA produced a video called "#Proud of China UMD" that alleged that Yang's speech included "false statements and rumor".

=== State media ===
The People's Daily, the official newspaper of the Central Committee of the Chinese Communist Party, attacked Yang's speech.

=== Chinese netizens ===
Yang's speech was met with an uproar online, and her Sina Weibo account was promptly filled with angry comments. Netizens called her a "traitor", a "liar", and expressed disbelief that an American university would allow such a speech to be made. Some urged others to "dig up dirt" on Yang's family, and the home address of her family was shared widely online.

Many comments criticized the comparison of the air quality between the U.S. and China, though commentators observed that this was mainly a political metaphor. Netizens found out that she grew up in Kunming, leading the Kunming city government to respond that the city's air was "more than likely to be 'sweet and fresh'" given that authorities report that the air quality there is "excellent". In a survey of 23 Chinese undergraduate students published in the Studies in Higher Education, the scholar Kai Zhao found that nearly every student disagreed with her speech, believing that she exaggerated how much air pollution was happening in China. In what The Guardian called an "apparent attempt to defuse the situation", Yang posted an apology sentence online.

=== University of Maryland ===
In response to the furor, the University of Maryland issued a statement supporting Yang's "right to share her views and her unique perspectives", adding that "respectfully engaging with those whom we disagree are essential skills, both within university walls and beyond". The university stated that Yang was selected to deliver the commencement speech by a committee, on the basis of her performance as a "top student", and stated that it "proudly supports" her right to freedom of speech.

== Interpretation ==
Commentators viewed the furor as emblematic of the tension between the values of Western universities, which espouse freedom of speech as essential to academic inquiry, and the mainland Chinese people who increasingly study at these institutions, partly as a result of Chinese government policy to "assemble broad numbers of students abroad as a positive patriotic energy". In the wake of the controversy following Yang's speech, a BBC editorial referred to these "angry student patriots" as China's "new Red Guards".

The scholar Fran Martin studied the speech in her 2022 book Dreams of Flight: The Lives of Chinese Women Students in the West. She wrote, "The participants in the WeChat discussion quoted earlier were right to point out that at the rhetorical level, Yang's speech references well-worn tropes for the representation of China in Western liberal democracies. It paints China as the locus of repression and the West as the site of freedom, and implies a correspondingly binary model of available subject positions for Chinese people." Martin continued to call Chinese responses to the speech "a performative ethics of national representation".

The academic Yi Guo compared the furor Yang's speech ignited in China with the lack of reaction that the American media had to the Peking University graduation speech of American student Cody Abbey. After Abbey compared American president Donald Trump to the Qing dynasty's cruel first emperor and praised Confucianism, the sole response was from the expatriate publication The Beijinger that said Abbey had "pander[ed]" to the Chinese government and had disparaged Trump. Guo concluded, "Backlash versus applause: the contrasting responses to the graduation speeches of Yang and Abbey once again sparked criticism of the lack of freedom of speech in mainland China."

== Bibliography ==
- Guo, Yi (2020). Freedom of the Press in China: A Conceptual History, 1831–1949. Amsterdam: Amsterdam University Press. pp. 15–17. doi:10.1515/9789048544622. ISBN 978-94-6372-611-5.
- Martin, Fran (2022). Dreams of Flight: The Lives of Chinese Women Students in the West. Durham, North Carolina: Duke University Press. pp. 215–222, 240. ISBN 978-1-4780-1493-5 – via Google Books.
- Zhao, Kai (May 10, 2019). "Made in contemporary China: exploring the national identity of Chinese international undergraduate students in the US". Studies in Higher Education. 45 (12): 3, 6, 9. doi:10.1080/03075079.2019.1615046.
