= Vultr =

American cloud infrastructure company

- Industry: Cloud computing
- Founded: 2014; 12 years ago
- Founder: David Aninowsky
- Headquarters: West Palm Beach, Florida, United States
- Number of locations: 33 data center regions
- Key people: J.J. Kardwell (CEO)
- Products: Cloud compute, storage, GPU resources
- ASN: 20473
- Website: www.vultr.com

Vultr is an American cloud computing company that provides cloud infrastructure and is headquartered in West Palm Beach, Florida. The company provides cloud compute, cloud storage, cloud networking, GPU-as-a-service and bare metal-as-a-service. It operates data centers in over 30 regions worldwide.

== History ==
Vultr was founded in 2014 by David Aninowsky.

In 2024, Vultr raised $333 million in a funding round led by AMD and LuminArx Capital Management. In 2025, Vultr secured an additional $329 million in credit financing from financial institutions, including Bank of America, Citi, and Goldman Sachs.

Vultr is building a 50-megawatt cluster of Advanced Micro Devices Inc. (AMD) artificial intelligence processors at a data center in Ohio. The company plans to spend more than $1 billion on the facility, which will come online in the first quarter of 2026.

Vultr's senior management includes CEO J.J. Kardwell, COO David Gucker, CIO Anthony Quon, CMO Kevin Cochrane, SVP of Global Finance and Accounting Matt Short, General Manager of AI and Enterprise Cloud Amit Rai, and SVP of Engineering Nathan Goulding.

In 2025, Tencent pressured Vultr to shut down FreeWeChat, a project by GreatFire that archives censored WeChat posts. According to GreatFire, Vultr suspended FreeWeChat's servers without thoroughly investigating the claims, ignoring responses from GreatFire and letters of support from human rights organizations. Vultr formally terminated FreeWeChat's hosting in November 2025.

== Operations ==
Vultr provides access to cloud infrastructure services and virtualized GPUs. The company operates data centers across North America, South America, Europe, Asia, the Middle East, Sub-Saharan Africa, and Australia.

== See also ==
- Cloud computing
- Cloud hosting
- Infrastructure as a service
