= Pallabi Munsi =

Indian investigative journalist and producer

- Born: Kolkata, India
- Education: Presidency College, Kolkata (BA in History); Asian College of Journalism, Chennai (Postgraduate degree in Journalism)
- Occupations: Journalist; Investigative reporter; News producer
- Employer(s): CNN; OZY Media; Hindustan Times; The Indian Express; Mumbai Mirror
- Relatives: Annada Munsi (grandfather); Munshi family

Pallabi Munsi is an Indian investigative reporter and producer working from CNN’s London bureau. She covers Europe, the Middle East, Africa and the Asia-Pacific region, leading in-depth investigations for CNN’s television and digital platforms. She was part of the CNN team behind the Emmy Award-winning documentary Going Home: The War in Sudan.

== Career ==
Munsi joined CNN in 2021 as the Asia reporter for the network’s 'As Equals' initiative, initially based in New Delhi before relocating to London in 2023. After the 2023 outbreak of the war in Sudan, she became a key contributor to CNN’s reporting on the conflict, collaborating with Chief International Investigative Correspondent Nima Elbagir on inquiries into alleged war crimes, human rights violations and arms-supply networks. She led the research for Elbagir’s documentary Going Home: The War in Sudan, which won the 2024 Emmy Award for 'Outstanding Investigative News: Long Form'. In addition to her work on Sudan, Munsi has led long-form investigations covering the Gaza war, the protests in Iran following the death of Mahsa Amini, and the civil war in Myanmar after the 2021 military coup. While working with 'As Equals' she initiated several Asia-Pacific investigations, including reporting on skin-whitening practices in India and on the doxxing of female pro-democracy activists in Myanmar; the latter project was among CNN’s early uses of artificial intelligence in newsgathering. Before her appointment at CNN, Munsi worked as a features correspondent at OZY Media, contributing to and producing stories on politics, gender, technology and human-rights issues. Earlier in her career, she held newsroom roles at the Hindustan Times, The Indian Express and the Mumbai Mirror, gaining experience across major Indian publications.

== Awards ==
- Led the research for Nima Elbagir's Going Home: The War in Sudan, which won the Emmy Award for 'Outstanding Investigative News: Long Form (2024)'.
- Nominated for a News Emmy Award in 2026 for Outstanding Research: News for Chasing A Ghost: The Search for Austin Tice
- Member of a team that was runner-up at the AIB Awards (2023) and shortlisted for the Foreign Press Association awards for work on Sudan.
- Part of the 'As Equals' team that received the Society of Professional Journalists’ Sigma Delta Chi Award (Inequalities in Society, 2022), a Silver Lovie Award (2023) and a commendation at the Drum Online Media Awards (2022).
- Munsi's work was shortlisted for the British Journalism Awards.

== Education ==
Munsi was educated at Presidency College, Kolkata (now Presidency University, Kolkata) with a Bachelor of Arts degree in History from the University of Calcutta. She earned postgraduate degree in journalism from the Asian College of Journalism, Chennai.

== Personal life ==
A member of Munshi family and granddaughter of Indian commercial artist Annada Munsi, Munsi was born and brought up in Kolkata, India, to Pabitrajit Munsi and Kabita Munsi. She lost both of her parents to COVID-19.
