= Melissa Chan =

American broadcast journalist

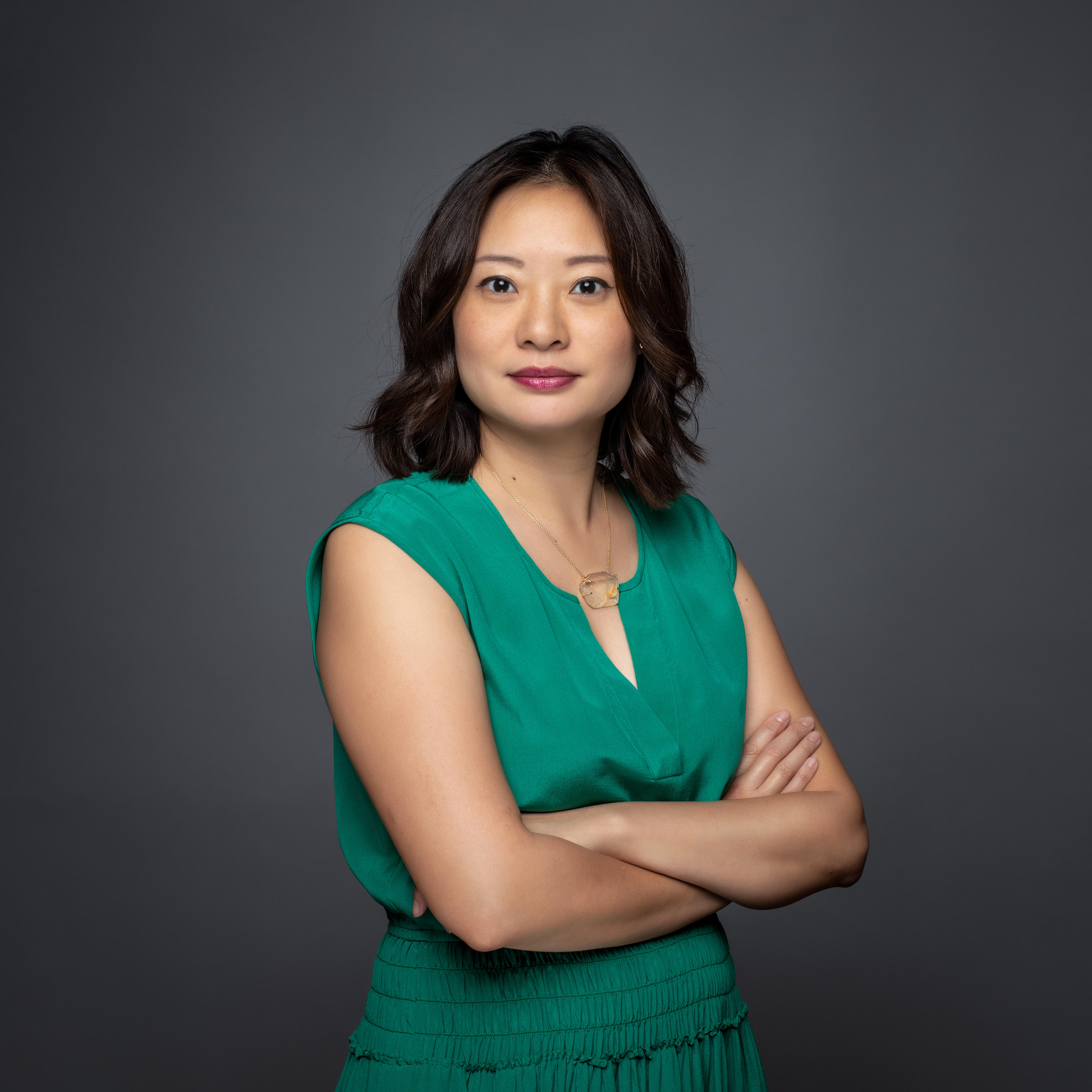
- Born: June 2, 1980 (age 46); British Hong Kong
- Citizenship: American
- Education: Yale University; London School of Economics and Political Science; Stanford University
- Occupation: Journalist
- Years active: 2002–present

Chinese name
- Traditional Chinese: 陳嘉韻
- Simplified Chinese: 陈嘉韵
Transcriptions
Standard Mandarin
- Hanyu Pinyin: Chén Jiāyùn
- Wade–Giles: Chen^{2} Jia^{1} yun^{4}

Melissa Chan (Chinese: 陳嘉韻; Cantonese Yale: Chàn Gāwahn, June 2, 1980) is a Chinese American freelance journalist working in broadcast and print. Her works have appeared in The New York Times, The Atlantic, The Guardian, The Washington Post, VICE News, POLITICO, and Foreign Policy. She has reported for VICE News Tonight, Al Jazeera English, and presents DW News Asia on Deutsche Welle TV. She has appeared as a guest on CNN and the BBC.

== Early life ==
Chan was born in 1980 in British Hong Kong and grew up in the Los Angeles area after her family emigrated to the United States when she was three years old.

Chan attended Yale University, graduating in 2002 with a B.A. in history. In 2005, she completed a Masters of Science in comparative politics at the London School of Economics and Political Science (LSE) in the United Kingdom.

== Career ==
=== Early career ===
Chan worked for ABC News in New York from 2002 to 2004, eventually joining the production team at World News Tonight. After she moved to the UK to begin her studies at LSE, Chan continued working for ABC at its London bureau.

Upon completion of her M.Sc., Chan worked as a freelance journalist in Hong Kong.

=== Al Jazeera English ===
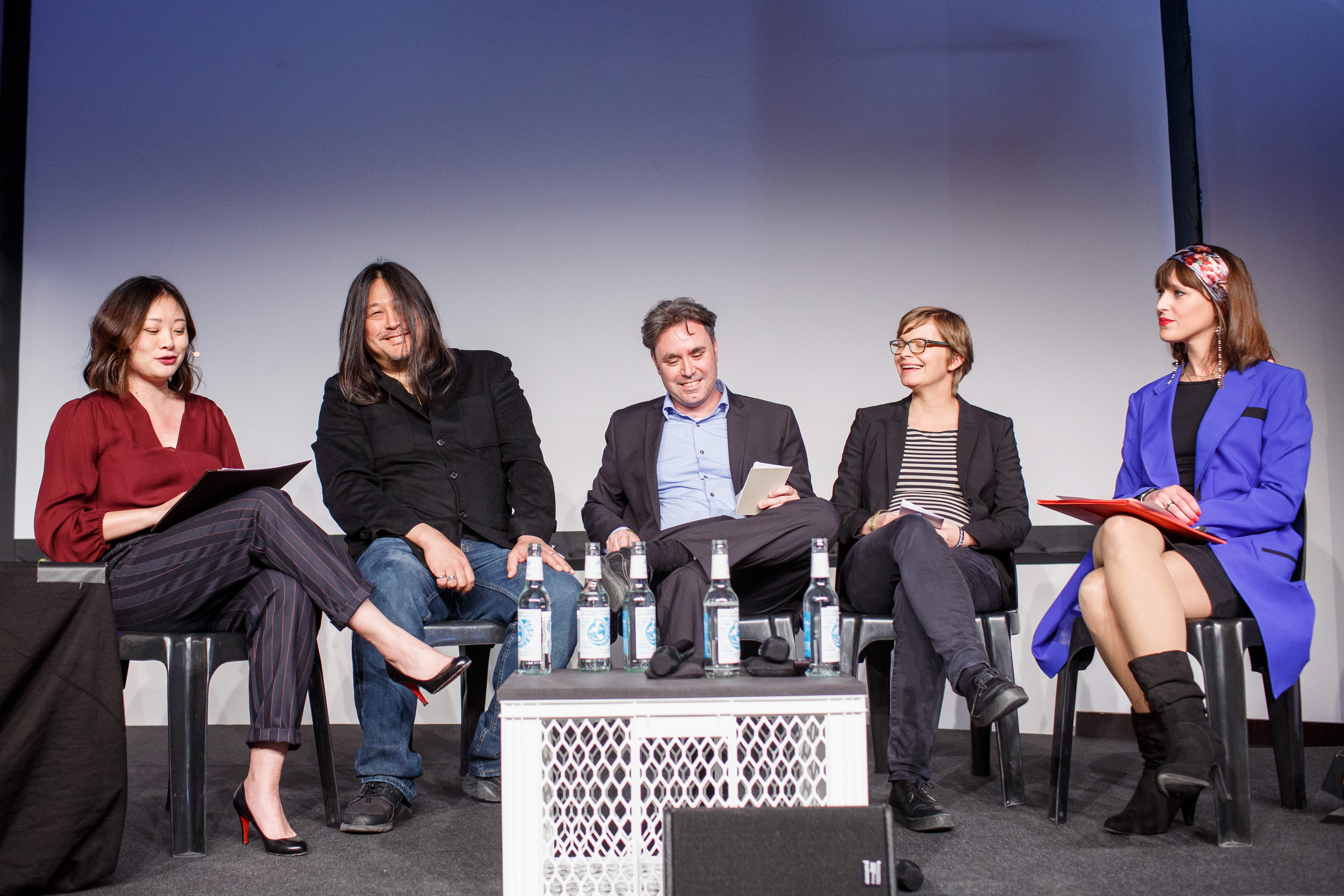
Chan (far left) during a panel discussion 'Beyond Black Mirror - China's Social Credit System' (2019)

In 2007, Al Jazeera English hired Chan to work as a China correspondent at the network's Beijing bureau. During her five years with Al Jazeera English, she filed some 400 reports, including stories on land confiscation and so-called "black jails." Chan also reported stories from North Korea. In 2010, Chan wrote about the use of the money allocated to help survivors and for reconstruction following the 2010 Yushu earthquake. The Government of China passed a regulation requiring major NGOs to transfer all donations for the reconstruction to the local administrators. Officials say it is to better track - and make better use of - the US$1.57 billion in donations to help victims. But such a move has never happened before, and it sets a precedent which some say is a step backwards for civil society in China, putting all NGOs firmly under government control.

In 2012, Chan left China after her visa and press credentials were not renewed and Al Jazeera English closed its Beijing bureau. The Chinese government provided no explanation for the move, though officials had previously accused Chan of unspecified violations of the law that were never clarified. Press reports and the Foreign Correspondent's Club of China connected the expulsion to a documentary on slave labor in Chinese jails aired by Al Jazeera English that had angered Chinese authorities. Chan had no part in the production of the piece, however, and her expulsion occurred in the context of multiple conflicts between foreign reporters and the Chinese government over denials or delays in obtaining journalist visas.

In May 2012 Yang Rui, a TV host in China Global Television Network, made comments on Sina Weibo criticising some foreign citizens and journalists in China, especially targeting Chan, who was expelled from the country. Yang's statement occurred during an official Chinese government campaign to identify illegal foreign residents in China. Yang's full posting (translated from Mandarin by The Wall Street Journal) was:

The Public Security Bureau wants to clean out the foreign trash: To arrest foreign thugs and protect innocent girls, they need to concentrate on the disaster zones in [student district] Wudaokou and [drinking district] Sanlitun. Cut off the foreign snake heads. People who can’t find jobs in the U.S. and Europe come to China to grab our money, engage in human trafficking and spread deceitful lies to encourage emigration. Foreign spies seek out Chinese girls to mask their espionage and pretend to be tourists while compiling maps and GPS data for Japan, Korea and the West. We kicked out that foreign bitch and closed Al-Jazeera’s Beijing bureau. We should shut up those who demonize China and send them packing.

Yang released a statement on May 21, 2012, defending his comments and seeking to correct supposed mischaracterisations of his message and the English translation of "foreign bitch" instead of "foreign shrew".

=== Stanford University and Al Jazeera America ===
After leaving China, Chan completed a John S. Knight Journalism Fellowship at Stanford University during the 2012–2013 academic year. She spent her year developing digital security training and tools for journalists facing potential hacker attacks from state-sponsored entities.

Chan later became a correspondent in San Francisco for Al Jazeera America, where she worked from the network launch in August 2013 until its closure in April 2016. During her time with AJA, she reported on stories from the rural American West. She also has reported from Canada, Cuba, Hong Kong, Israel, North Korea, South Korea, Malaysia, Mongolia, Palestinian Territories, and Russia.

=== Independent Journalism ===
She spent time in Germany as a Robert Bosch Stiftung Transatlantic Fellow. She now works as a foreign affairs reporter based between Los Angeles and Berlin. She is a contributor to the Global Reporting Centre.
