= Paikpara =

- Neighbourhood in Kolkata (Calcutta)
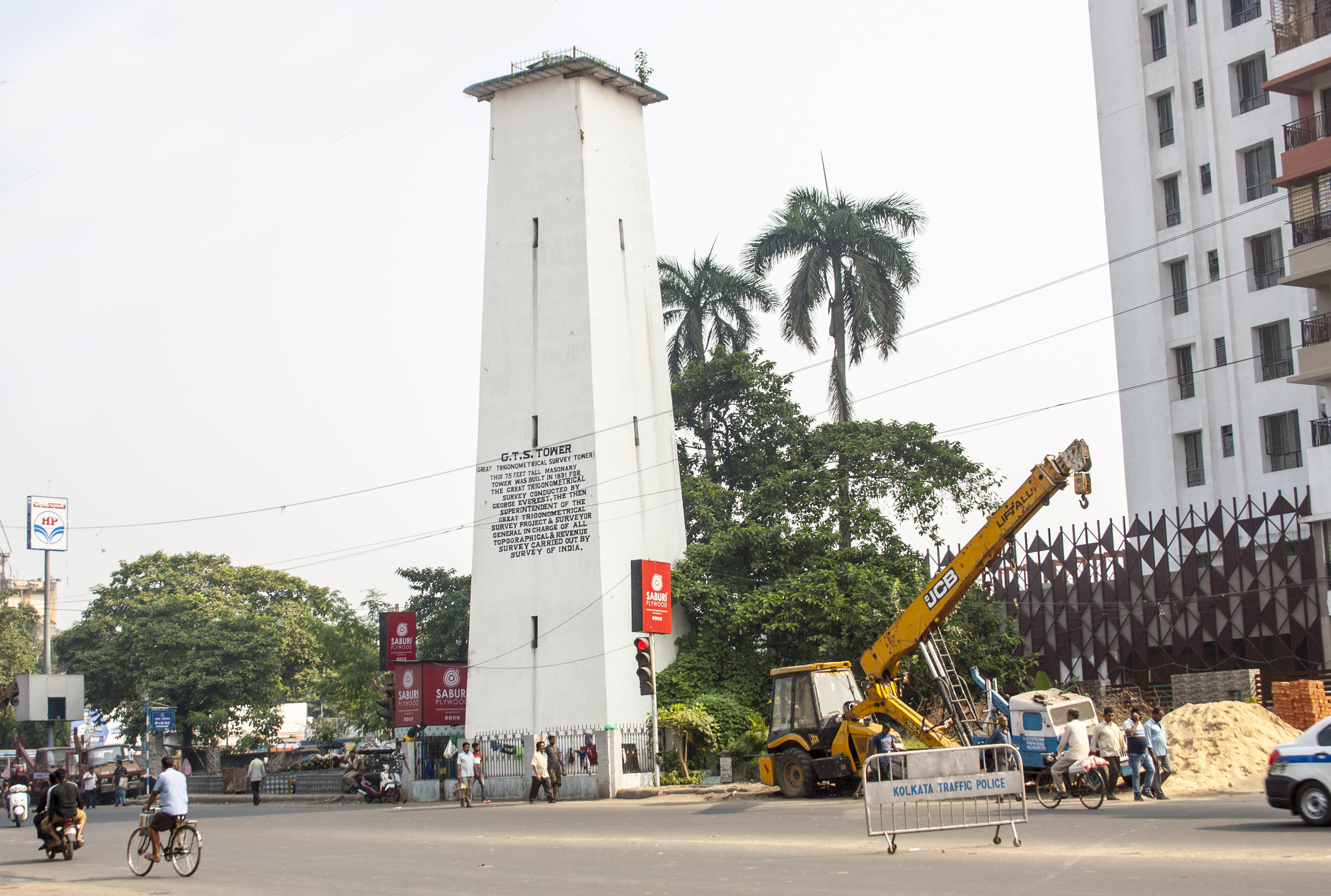
- G.T.S Tower, Paikpara

- Location in Kolkata Paikpara (West Bengal)
- Coordinates: 22.6157°N 88.3874°E
- Country: India
- State: West Bengal
- City: Kolkata
- District: Kolkata
- Metro Station: Dum Dum
- Kolkata Suburban Railway: Dum Dum Junction
- Municipal Corporation: Kolkata Municipal Corporation
- KMC ward: 3, 4

Population
  - Total: For population see linked KMC ward page
- Time zone: UTC+5:30 (IST)
- PIN: 700030, 700037
- Area code: +91 33
- Lok Sabha constituency: Kolkata Uttar
- Vidhan Sabha constituency: Kashipur-Belgachhia

Paikpara is a neighbourhood of North Kolkata in Kolkata district in the Indian state of West Bengal.
