= Criticism of Confucius Institutes =

The Confucius Institute (CI) program, which began establishing centers for Chinese language instruction in 2004, has been the subject of criticisms, concerns, and controversies during its international expansion.

Many such concerns stem from the CI's relationship to Chinese Communist Party (CCP) authorities, giving rise to criticisms about undermining academic freedom at host universities, engaging in industrial and military espionage, surveillance of Chinese students abroad, and attempts to advance the Chinese government's political agendas on controversial issues such as Taiwan, and human rights in China and Tibet. Additional concerns have arisen over the institutes' financial and academic viability, teaching quality, and relations with Chinese partner universities.

Confucius Institutes have defended their establishments, comparing them with other cultural promotion organizations such as Alliance française and Goethe-Institut. However, unlike the Alliance française or Goethe-Institut, many Confucius Institutes operate directly on university campuses, thus giving rise to unique concerns related to academic freedom and political influence. A report released by the Government Accountability Office (GAO) in February 2019 which reviewed 90 agreements establishing Confucius Institutes said "While 42 of 90 agreements contained language about the document being confidential, some were available online or upon request, and one-third of the 90 agreements explicitly addressed how U.S. school policies apply to the institutes." Some observers have noted that CIs are largely limited to teaching cultural and language programs, and the institutes' staff tend to see political and controversial subjects as human rights and democracy as outside the context of the mission of a Confucius Institute.

== Background ==
The Confucius Institute program began in 2004 and is financed by the quasi-governmental Office of Chinese Language Council International (colloquially, Hanban), which is chaired by Politburo member and Vice Premier Liu Yandong, former head of the United Front Work Department. Hanban is governed by "a council of high state and party officials" drawn from a variety of party and state ministries including Foreign Affairs, Education, and the State Council Information Office (also known as the "Office of Foreign Propaganda"). Marshall Sahlins of the University of Chicago describes Hanban as "an instrument of the party state operating as an international pedagogical organization". The institutes operate in co-operation with local affiliate colleges and universities around the world. The related Confucius Classroom program partners with secondary schools and school districts to provide Chinese language teachers and instructional materials.

The Confucius Institute has grown rapidly from one campus in Seoul in 2004 to more than 400 worldwide in 2013, and opposition to the program "has grown almost as dramatically". In 2023, there were 498 CIs and 773 Confucius Classrooms in more than 160 countries and regions. Critics have accused CIs of having restrictive hiring practices and not conforming to western political ideals on issues such as the legitimacy of the Taiwanese state and origins of the Korean War.

In evidence of the "spectacular proliferation" of CIs, Lionel Jensen notes they have become so familiar in the United States a segment of The Daily Show made a parody out of a community group's opposition to the CI teaching Mandarin in a public school.

== Objectives ==
Confucius Institutes' stated missions are to promote knowledge of Chinese language and culture abroad, as well as to promote commercial and trade cooperation. In the context of the Chinese Communist Party's foreign policy objectives, the institutes serve as tools of cultural diplomacy intended to bolster China's soft power abroad.

Official Communist Party literature describes the Institutes in the context of Hu Jintao's soft power initiatives, designed to influence perceptions of China and its policies abroad. Li Changchun, the 5th-highest-ranking member of the Politburo Standing Committee, was quoted in The Economist saying the Institutes were "an important part of China's overseas propaganda set-up".

The Economist notes China "has been careful not to encourage these language centres to act as overt purveyors of the party's political viewpoints, and little suggests they are doing so", but also noted the important goal of giving the world a "more accurate" understanding of China, as well as efforts in opposing Chinese dissident groups abroad, such as anti-communist party groups, separatist activities, and the Falun Gong in California.

Lionel M. Jensen, associate professor of East Asian languages and cultures from the University of Notre Dame, while noting "so far there have not been any events in which the academic freedom of the host university was explicitly threatened by authorities of Hanban", expressed concerns regarding the CI's educational diversity and quality of teaching. Jensen said the Hanban has reduced the diversity of China's cultures to a "uniform, quaint commodity", characterized by Chinese opera and dance performances, which he calls "culturetainment", meaning "the abridgment of Chinese civilization in the name of digestible forms of cultural appeal can be readily shipped overseas."

Randolph Kluver, Director of the Confucius Institute at Texas A&M University, said that the soft power paradigm was inadequate for understanding CIs, which could better be understood within a "communicative paradigm" of bringing China's cultural resources into a global conversation about values, politics, and culture. Kluver concluded that despite the Western suspicions of a Communist Party agenda, Confucius Institutes had little impact on attitudes towards the Chinese government.

The New York Times foreign correspondent Jane Perlez reported that the 2013 Pew Global Attitudes Project survey revealed China's approval rating in the United States had dropped 14 percentage points in two years, to the lowest rating for China in any region of the world. Perlez cited an article in the Journal of Contemporary China by Tao Xie, a professor of political science at Beijing Foreign Studies University, who said in an interview that his analysis "was rejected by Chinese academic publications because it criticized the Confucius Institutes that the Chinese government has opened in many countries." Professor Tao statistically analyzed data from the 2007 Pew Global Attitudes survey for factors that affect cross-national variations in China's national image. Presuming that Chinese foreign direct investment would increase positive public perceptions of China among recipients, Tao tested and disproved a hypothesis that "the number of Confucius institutes in a country should be positively related to favorable opinions about China among that country's people." Tao notes that the number of institutes many be endogenous in statistical terms, because the Hanban has opened most CIs in Europe and North America, "where perceptions of China have been the most unfavorable". Professor Tao concludes that the data reveal, "the Confucius institutes and classrooms have not succeeded in reversing the rather negative image of China in most of the countries where they are located." This conclusion was criticized by other Chinese scholars as "limited", who reject this causational relationship, claiming instead that favorability of China is not solely determined by Confucius Institutes.

Addressing a 2014 Dublin conference for European CIs, Liu Yunshan, Director of the Propaganda Department of the Chinese Communist Party, said Confucius Institutes had emerged at the right moment, and described them as a "spiritual high-speed rail" [心灵高铁], promoting friendship by connecting "Chinese dreams" with those of the rest of the world.

== Relationship with the government of China ==
A number of criticisms surrounding the Confucius Institutes stem from their relationships with the Chinese government, through the Office of Chinese Language Council International or "Hanban". The Hanban website states that Confucius Institutes and Classrooms are non-profit educational institutions, but they have close ties to several senior CCP officials, including the current Hanban chair and Politburo member Liu Yandong, who was formerly head of the United Front Work Department. The Hanban members encompass twelve Chinese government institutions, from the Ministry of Education to the State Council Information Office (or "Office of Foreign Propaganda") and the National Development and Reform Commission, "through organizations dealing with Finance, Overseas Chinese, Foreign Affairs, Foreign Trade, Culture and all the media organizations." "United Front Work" is a concept that harks back to the Chinese Civil War and refers to "Beijing's efforts to identify friends and isolate enemies. The logic here is that true friends will identify and isolate enemies from the CCP, while hiding any hint of direct involvement by the Party itself." Steven W. Mosher, president of the Population Research Institute, testified the United Front Work Department's purpose "is subversion, cooption and control", and claimed one of the CI's chief purposes is "to subvert, coopt, and ultimately control Western academic discourse on matters pertaining to China."

An article from the state-run China Daily said that "Confucius Institutes' work is misunderstood from time to time," citing the example of Mosher calling CIs "Trojan Horses with Chinese characteristics." In response, Xu Lin, director-general of the Hanban, said, "The Confucius Institutes are definitely not Trojan Horses, since we are holding no weapons in our hands." An Asian Survey article notes concerns over a "Trojan horse effect" of CIs. "The Confucius Institute project can be seen at one level as an attempt to increase Chinese language learning and an appreciation of Chinese culture, but at another level it is part of a broader soft power projection in which China is attempting to win hearts and minds for political purposes." Besides CIs, some other ways China raises its cultural profile overseas include Chinese contemporary art exhibitions, television programs, concerts by popular singers, and translations of Chinese literature.

According to Fabrice de Pierrebourg and Michel Juneau-Katsuya, a number of individuals holding positions within the Confucius Institute system have backgrounds in Chinese security agencies and United Front Work Department, "which manages important dossiers concerning foreign countries. These include propaganda, the control of Chinese students abroad, the recruiting of agents among the Chinese diaspora (and among sympathetic foreigners), and long-term clandestine operations."

A declassified intelligence report by the Canadian Security Intelligence Service (CSIS) says, "Beijing is out to win the world's hearts and minds, not just its economic markets, as a means of cementing power." In an interview on CBC Television, Richard Fadden, director of the CSIS, said that while China was funding Confucius Institutes in most of the campuses across Canada, they were "managed by people operating out of the embassy or consulates" who had organized "demonstrations to deal with what are called the five poisons: Taiwan, Falun Gong and others". Stockholm's Institute for Security and Development Policy described the founding of CIs as "an image management project, the purpose of which is to promote the greatness of Chinese culture while at the same time counterattacking public opinion which maintains the presence of a 'China threat' in the international community."

Although the number of Indian students taking Chinese language courses is on the increase, the Ministry of External Affairs rejected the idea of establishing Confucius Institutes in schools, as they were "using culture to spread propaganda and influence". Of the more than 17 CIs launched in Japan since 2005, all were at private colleges, instead of at more prestigious national universities. "Chinese culture traditionally holds significant influence in Japan, but people remain concerned by the potential ideological and cultural threat of Chinese government-run projects such as CIs."

A Der Spiegel article about threats from China's soft power criticized Beijing for using Confucius Institutes "in hopes of promoting what it views as China's cultural superiority". German sinologists disagree about the degree of government control over the system. Jörg-Meinhard Rudolph from the East Asia Institute (Ludwigshafen) noted no German political party had financed any educational institutions in German universities, "yet they are accepting money from the undemocratic Chinese Communist Party." Michael Lackner, deputy head of the Confucius Institute at the University of Erlangen-Nuremberg, described the influence of German universities and said, "I am not sure whether Confucius Institute Headquarters really know what Chinese culture is. Thus, German academics could help define Chinese culture as a world culture."

At a hearing of the United States-China Economic and Security Review Commission, Anne-Marie Brady, a University of Canterbury political science professor, testified that China considers propaganda work the "life blood of the Party-State in the current era", and promotes foreign propaganda towards the Overseas Chinese community through Confucius Institutes and activities such as "root-seeking" cultural tours. Three years later, Professor Brady analogized, "If we had a U.S. government agency that was stating that it was a tool for U.S. government propaganda, my colleagues would be up in arms about having a center like that on campus."

There has also been criticism over the Communist Party's appropriation of Confucius. Under Mao Zedong, Confucian values and teachings were perennial targets of criticism and suppression, being viewed as vestiges of feudalism. According to Asia Times Online, the Chinese Communist Party under Mao Zedong criticized Confucian teachings as "rubbish that should be thrown into the 'Ash heap of history'" while the 21st-century CCP uses Confucianism as "an assistant to the Chinese god of wealth (and a representative of Chinese diplomacy), but not a tutor for Chinese soul."

=== Comparisons with similar organizations ===
Confucius Institutes are frequently compared to cultural associations such as the UK's British Council, Germany's Goethe-Institut, France's Alliance Française, Italy's Società Dante Alighieri, and Spain's Instituto Cervantes. For instance, an editorial in the state-owned China Daily newspaper accused CI opponents of double standards for not calling "Goethe-Institut, Alliance Française or Cervantes Institutes propaganda vehicles or tools of cultural invasion". The editorial noted that "China is not the first to set up such institutes nor does it have a monopoly over overseas cultural promotion."

However, unlike the aforementioned organizations, the CI model is attachment to universities or other educational institutions, thus leading to suspicions the institutes are "aimed less at fostering interest in China and Chinese culture itself, and more at ensuring that such interest is guided along lines approved of by the Chinese party-state." Steven Mosher notes: "Unlike Alliance Francaise, the Confucius Institutes are not independent from their government; unlike the Goethe-Institut establishments, they do not occupy their own premises. Instead, participating universities agree to provide office space in exchange for funding, and to cede academic control to the United Front Work Department of the Chinese Communist Party." Martin Davidson, chief executive of the British Council, criticized comparisons between his institution and CIs. "We are a stand-alone organization operating out of our own premises. They are being embedded in university campuses. The real question has to be one of independence." Davidson said while the Chinese are very clear about wanting to combat negative propaganda with positive propaganda, "The danger is more of self-censorship – which is a very subtle thing."

Jocelyn Chey, a former diplomat and expert in Australia-China relations, stated the Confucius Institutes are more closely managed by its government compared with its French counterpart. She believes the institute's program is most valuable where it supports culture and outreach into the community. Chey however states CI is "a propaganda vehicle for the Chinese communist party, and not a counterpart to the Goethe Institute or Alliance Française", and speculates the close links between the institutes and the Chinese Communist Party "could lead at best to a 'dumbing down' of research and at worst could produce propaganda." On the other hand, The Sydney Morning Herald cites a Queensland University of Technology student that "It would be best to understand [Confucius institutes] not as 'propaganda tools' but as 'one instrument of China's cultural diplomacy to wield and bolster Chinese soft power globally'".

Confucius Institutes also bear similarities to the Chinese Students and Scholars Association which has come under criticism for interference by the Chinese government on American university campuses.

== Financing ==
Confucius Institutes mostly run a small number of classes, with an average budget of US$400,000 per institute in 2009. They are funded jointly by grants from China's Ministry of Education and funds from host universities; although Hanban set a financial objective for self-sufficiency within five years, many CIs have struggled. David Shambaugh says Confucius Institute funding "is in fact laundered through the MOE from the CCPPD's [i.e., CCP Propaganda Department's] External Propaganda Department".

David Prager Branner, a Chinese professor at Columbia University, warns that taking money from China to set up Confucius Institutes could have long-term consequences and questions whether it would be in America's national interest. Some critics have suggested Beijing's contributions to host universities gives Chinese authorities too much leverage over those institutions. The sizeable grants coming with the establishment of Confucius Institutes could make universities more susceptible to pressures from Beijing to exercise self-censorship, particularly on Chinese human rights issues or other politically sensitive topics. The Economist points out that some Chinese language courses at Confucius Institutes are even paid for by the Pentagon under the National Security Language Initiative.

In January 2010, the Ministry of Finance of the People's Republic of China announced that the winning bid (CEIECZB01-09JX033) to build and maintain the Confucius Institute Online website was awarded to the Hanban subsidiary company Wuzhou Hanfeng Web Technology Ltd. (Wuzhou Hanfeng Wangluo Keji 五洲汉风网络科技) for 35.2 million yuan (US$5.7 million), which was called "the most expensive website in history" ("史上最贵网站"). Chinese and foreign media outlets reported that Wuzhou Hanfeng Web Technology Ltd. was registered to Wang Yongli 王永利, Deputy Director-General of Hanban and Deputy Chief Executive of Confucius Institute Headquarters, and criticized the Hanban's lack of transparency and corruption. In response, Hanban Director-General Xia Jianhui 夏建辉 said "the website will eventually be made into a learning portal that will be promoted globally, this is a comprehensive project", and maintained that the Hanban did not break any rules by allowing their own subsidiary company to win the contract.

Maria Wey-Shen Siow, East Asia bureau chief of Channel NewsAsia, wrote in the East-West Center's Asia Pacific Bulletin the concerns over Confucius Institutes projecting political undertones "are not completely unfounded, but may not be totally warranted". She highlights, for all the CI controversies, "Han Ban's annual budget was only US$145 million in 2009 so it would be false to state China has been spending massively on these institutes." Lionel Jensen writes, "According to a 2006 BBC report, the Chinese government initially committed $10 billion for operating the Confucius Institute program."

In a 2010 Senate Foreign Relations Committee hearing, Senator Richard Lugar asked Secretary of State Hillary Clinton why China had established 60 Confucius Institutes in the United States but only permitted 4 comparable US cultural centers in China, and she replied, "The Chinese government provides each center with a million dollars to launch, plus they cover operating expenses that exceed $200,000 per year. We don't have that kind of money in the budget."

Some critics, including within China, have expressed worry "the government's support for the CIs' budgets detracts from domestic spending" when the Ministry of Education "budget for domestic compulsory education remains inadequate". Swedish parliamentarian Göran Lindblad asked why Chinese authorities are subsidizing Western educational institutions when "China has ten million children without proper schools."

Financing for the Confucius Institute at the London School of Economics came under criticism following the "LSE Gaddafi links" controversy over accepting a £1.5 million donation from Libya. Christopher Hughes, professor of international relations, said the school's acceptance of about £400,000 from China showed it had failed to learn from the scandal. Hughes accused the CI of being a "divisive" and "illegitimate" propaganda organization, and said its existence would damage the school's reputation. In reference to Hughes, Liu Xiaoming, Chinese ambassador to the United Kingdom, accused CI critics of clinging to "outdated 'cold war' mentality"; to which Hughes replied that it was "gross interference" for Liu to complain about an internal LSE discussion on ethics.

On 10 June, Hughes emailed colleagues discussing CI teaching materials a link to an animated video, in Chinese with English subtitles, on the official Confucius Institute Online website. It was titled "The War to Resist US Aggression and Aid Korea" (which is the Chinese official name Kangmeiyuanchao zhanzheng 抗美援朝战争 for "Korean War) and summarized the Korean War with negative historical revisionism. Specifically, the film "declares that the Chinese were provoked into entering the war because the United States had bombed Chinese villages near the Korean border, and had manipulated the UN Security Council into passing a resolution that enabled American troops to expand aggression against Korea." After the video link began circulating on Twitter, the CI website deleted the webpage on 11 June, but cache copies remain available. This educational animation was part of an online "Chinese history" course under the CI homepage's "Chinese Learning for Kids & Teens" section. The censored video claimed the "United States manipulated the UN Security Council ... to enlarge the aggression against Korea" and "tried to seize the whole peninsula"; in response, Chinese "volunteers" from the People's Liberation Army joined the fight and "crushed the imperialists' aggressive ambitions", which "enhanced China's international prestige" in the Korean War.

A 2012 article in The Atlantic questions whether China has squandered the soft-power money spent on CIs and expensive CCTV-4 America studios when wealthy Chinese are seeking exit visas to the US; asking, "What good are Confucius Institutes ... when many of your country's elites are voting with their feet and hedging against domestic unpredictability?"

The Economist describes the Hanban's spending on CIs as "considerable, and growing rapidly". In 2013 it was $278m, more than six times as much as in 2006. China's funding for Confucius Institutes amounts to about $100,000-200,000 a year on many campuses, and sometimes more. According to an article in Foreign Policy, many Chinese view this $278 million expenditure for an overseas soft-power initiative as a waste of money, which would be better spent on building schools in poor rural areas of China.

== Espionage ==
Critics of Confucius Institutes have cited concerns it could serve as a vehicle for industrial and military espionage, as well as for surveillance of Chinese students studying abroad. The intelligence services of several countries have investigated Confucius Institutes, including the Canadian organization CSIS. David Matas said that "informally [the institutes] become a vehicle the Chinese government uses to basically intimidate the academic institutions to run according to their guise and also as a vehicle for infiltration and spying into the campuses to find out what's going on hostile to their interest."

Pierrebourg and Juneau-Katsuya also raised concerns over ties between Confucius Institute administrators and large state-run Chinese companies. For instance, they point to the Confucius Institute at the University of Texas at Dallas, where one of the top officials is also vice-president of Huawei, a Chinese telecom company the U.S. government regards as a national security threat, and which has been accused of industrial espionage.

== Political ==
Confucius Institutes are described as transmitting political influence in a "sublimely veiled manner". Canada's Globe and Mail reported, "Despite their neutral scholarly appearance, the new network of Confucius Institutes does have a political agenda." For example, teaching with the simplified Chinese characters used in the PRC rather than the Traditional Chinese characters used in Taiwan "would help to advance Beijing's goal of marginalizing Taiwan in the battle for global influence." An article in China Heritage Quarterly criticizes teaching only simplified characters in the context of Confucius Institutes as "semi-literacy in Chinese". In response to the PRC's CI program, the Republic of China announced plans in 2011 to establish "Taiwan Academies" in America, Europe, and Asia as part of its cultural diplomacy. The Taiwan Academy program is designed to promote "Taiwanese-favored" Mandarin Chinese, traditional Chinese characters, and Taiwanese topics. Marshall Sahlins also makes this claim about simplified characters, which scholars have disputed; George Washington University historian Edward McCord says many Chinese language departments teach simplified characters of their own volition, and Lewis & Clark College anthropologist Jennifer Hubbert says Sahlins overlooked the fact that most trained sinologists can read Chinese in both character sets, and training in one does not preclude access to the other.

Peng Ming-min, a Taiwan independence activist and politician, writes although on the surface China merely demonstrates its "soft power" through CIs, "Colleges and universities where a Confucius Institute is established all have to sign a contract in which they declare their support for Beijing's "one China" policy. As a result, both Taiwan and Tibet have become taboos at these institutes." Peng lists other examples of CI "untouchable" issues including the 1989 Tiananmen Square massacre, neglect of human rights, environmental pollution in China, and the imprisonment of Liu Xiaobo. However, BC lawyer and China expert Clive Ansley said there were "troubling signs of [China's] growing influence on western campuses" before Confucius Institutes were established. He saw signs the public discussions about certain human-rights issues were being self-censored, out of fear of losing out on intake of Chinese students.

Michael Nylan, professor of Chinese history at the University of California at Berkeley, says CIs have become less heavy-handed in their demands, and have learned from "early missteps", such as insisting universities adopt a policy Taiwan is part of China. Nylan took an informal survey of faculty and administrators at fifteen universities with Confucius Institutes; "two respondents reported that institutes had exerted pressure to block guest speakers", but both events went ahead anyway.

Taiwan is one of the few major countries that do not have Confucius Institutes, and scholars from Academia Sinica's Center for Asia-Pacific Area Studies carried out a two-year research project to collect empirical evidence on CIs. The project leader Michael Hsiao (蕭新煌), chairperson of Academia Sinica's Institute of Sociology, said he learned the implicit rules about off-limit topics—Taiwan, Tibet, the Dalai Lama, the Tiananmen Square massacre, and Falun Gong—during interviews with staff at CI host institutions in Southeast Asian countries and in the US. Hsiao called the Hanban's rapid expansion of Confucius Institutes into over 105 countries "a smart move", but also mentioned that CI criticisms have arisen in at universities worldwide. "People in favor of the institutes say they bring in revenue and provide opportunities for students to learn Chinese. Those opposed to the initiative worry they place limitations on academic freedom and dislike the political machinations behind them."

== Censorship and academic freedom ==
Jonathan Zimmerman critically framed the question of Confucius Institutes and academic freedom, "Let's suppose that a cruel, tyrannical, and repressive foreign government offered to pay for American teens to study its national language in our schools. Would you take the deal?" Zimmerman concluded that more Americans should study Chinese, but "on our own terms, making sure that it also reflects our best civic language of freedom, open discussion, and democracy". Chinese history professor Jonathan Lipman from Mount Holyoke College expressed the dilemma of accepting CI funding thus: "By peddling a product we want, namely Chinese language study, the Confucius Institutes bring the Chinese government into the American academy in powerful ways. The general pattern is very clear. They can say, 'We'll give you this money, you'll have a Chinese program, and nobody will talk about Tibet.' In this economy, turning them down has real costs." Professor Terry Russell at the University of Manitoba questioned the Hanban's real motivation, fearing the university would not be able to organize certain activities judged "sensitive" to the Chinese, such as bringing the Dalai Lama onto campus. He said, "'We have a real conflict of our principles of academic freedom,' with the potential to have a faculty version of Chinese history and a Confucius Institute version being taught on campus." According to Cameron Morrill, president of the University of Manitoba Faculty Association, "It is inappropriate to allow any government, either foreign or domestic, control over a university classroom, regardless of how much money they offer." The university later decided against taking Chinese government money to set up CIs.

In 2010, the University of Oregon "came under – and resisted – pressure from the Chinese consul general in San Francisco" to cancel a lecture by Peng Ming-Min (see above). Glenn Anthony May, a UO history professor wrote an article expressing concerns that Confucius Institutes "come with visible strings attached". For instance, host institutions must sign a memorandum of understanding to support the One-China policy. "At universities, we normally have an opportunity to debate issues like that, allowing professors like me and students to take issue publicly with our government's policy. Hanban, for obvious reasons, wants no such discussion to occur." Meiru Liu, director of the Confucius Institute at Portland State University, rejects May's criticisms CIs hinder open discussions of issues such as the treatment of political activist Liu Xiaobo. Meiru Liu explained that while Falun Gong, dissidents and 1989 Tiananmen Square protests are not topics the Confucius Institute headquarters would like to see organized by the institutes, they are "not major interest and concerns now by general public at large here in the US." Fellow UO professor and CI director Bryna Goodman countered May, noting the local Confucius Institute hosted forums on sensitive topics such as China's internet censorship and economic regulations, and "We haven't gotten any topic that has been proposed to us that we have considered out of bounds."

The establishment of some Confucius Institutes has been opposed or blocked by faculty members at universities. Faculty at the University of Pennsylvania decided not to negotiate with CI due to fears of meddling in course curriculum. Members of the Chinese studies department at the University of Melbourne forced the institute off the main campus. Faculty at Stockholm University demanded the separation of the Nordic Confucius Institute from the university, but an independent assessment rejected their claims that the Chinese Embassy in Stockholm was using the CI for conducting political surveillance and inhibiting academic freedom.

In writing for The Christian Science Monitor, Jonathan Zimmerman, a historian at New York University, warned that Confucius Institutes resemble the 1930s "Mussolini model" of financing Italian language schools in America for Fascist propaganda purposes.

A major concern of Confucius Institutes is their response to politically sensitive and controversial material such as human rights and Taiwan. Meiru Liu, director of the Confucius Institute at Portland State University, states the local institute had sponsored lectures on Tibet, China's economic development, currency, and US-China relations. Mary E. Gallagher, director of the Center for Chinese Studies at the University of Michigan, said the institutes has been free in covering "that are controversial and sensitive in China". In particular, the Confucius Institute in Edinburgh promoted a talk by a dissident Chinese author whose works are banned in China.

Lionel M. Jensen, professor of East Asian Languages and history at the University of Notre Dame, said, "Every Confucius Institute is a spectacular experiment in cultural outreach", but "the placement of institutes within the centers, departments, and institutes of public and private universities is without precedent, and threatens the independent pursuit of research that is the enabling premise of higher education."

In June 2014, the American Association of University Professors (AAUP) called on American universities, almost a hundred of which have Confucius Institutes, to reexamine the price they are paying in academic freedom. The AAUP's Report on academic freedom stated, "Confucius Institutes function as an arm of the Chinese state and are allowed to ignore academic freedom."

A 21 June 2014 editorial in The Washington Post listed recent concerns about Confucius Institutes, including the AAUP advising universities to cut ties with CIs unless Hanban agreements are renegotiated, alleged violations of freedom of speech and human rights, and the secrecy of undisclosed contracts between schools and the Hanban. It concluded that "academic freedom cannot have a price tag", and recommended that if universities will not publish their CI agreements, the programs should end. The official Chinese news agency Xinhua "hit back with an angry editorial" on 24 June, saying the claims by the AAUP and others that CIs "function as an arm of the Chinese state and are pushing political agendas", actually "expose not so much communist propaganda as their own intolerance of exotic cultures and biased preconceived notions to smear and isolate the CPC".

=== United States ===
Columbia University received $1 million in Hanban funds over five years, to begin a CI. Professor Robert Barnett, the director of the Modern Tibetan Studies Program, described a "strange silence about Tibet and other sensitive issues when it comes to Columbia, academics, and talks of China." Barnett said, "The issue is not China wants to promote itself and pay for Chinese to be taught. The issue is it wants to have a presence in the campus and much more than that. It wants to have a presence in the faculty and in teaching departments." Lening Liu, director of the Confucius Institute at Columbia, said that it was "committed to academic integrity and that it would reject any attempt by Hanban to censor its research." Other academics have questioned how universities should respond when foreign governments limit academic freedom abroad. Since the 2001 publication of Columbia University professor Andrew J. Nathan's Tiananmen Papers, he and several other faculty members have been denied visas to China, and the Chinese government shut down the Modern Tibetan Studies Program's study abroad program in Tibet.

Over 170 University of Chicago faculty members petitioned president Robert Zimmer against the establishment, without Faculty Senate approval, of a CI. The petition called Confucius Institutes "an academically and politically ambiguous initiative" sponsored by the PRC, and said the university risked having its own reputation used to "legitimate the spread" of CIs in the United States and around the world.

In late October 2013, Marshall Sahlins, a professor emeritus at the University of Chicago, published the article "China U: Confucius Institutes censor political discussions and restrain the free exchange of ideas. Why, then, do American universities sponsor them?" arguing that universities like the University of Chicago should take the lead in canceling the arrangement. Writing in Forbes, the Irish journalist Eamonn Fingleton says, "In one of the most scandalous sell-outs in intellectual history, more and more universities now accept funding from the Beijing Ministry of Education". He calls the CI program a "Chinese mega-blooper", and says that largely thanks to Sahlins' leadership, "academic staff at many universities have begun agitating to rid campuses of the phenomenon".

In 2014, Professor Sahlins wrote Confucius Institutes: Academic Malware because incidents of academic malpractice in CIs, "from the virtually unnoticeable to the publicly notorious, are disturbingly common". Sahlins told the Times Higher Education that his book did not represent some sort of "rabid anti-communism of a McCarthyite or Cold War sort – as defenders of Confucius Institutes have claimed", but rather, the issue is the preservation of the "values of academic freedom and intellectual autonomy upon which universities in the US and most of the world are founded."

According to a Chronicle of Higher Education article, since the first Confucius Institute in the United States was established at the University of Maryland in 2004, "there have been no complaints of the institutes' getting in the way of academic freedom on American campuses"; the same article goes on to say that the Institutes are "distinct in the degree to which they were financed and managed by a foreign government".

Stanford University was initially offered $4 million to host a CI and endow a Confucius Institute Professorship in Sinology, but Hanban requested that the professor not discuss "delicate issues". After Stanford refused based on academic freedom grounds, Hanban accepted making an unrestricted gift, and the university plans to use the money for a professorship in classical Chinese poetry. Dean Richard Saller, who is also the CI director, explained the Hanban prizes the Stanford relationship too much to jeopardize it by interfering with academic freedom.

In 2009, North Carolina State University canceled a planned appearance by the Dalai Lama to speak on its Raleigh campus, citing concerns about a Chinese backlash and a shortage of time and resources. Provost Warwick Arden said "China is a major trading partner for North Carolina," and a CI presents an "opportunity for subtle pressure and conflict". However, in 2010, the Dalai Lama spoke at Stanford University and Miami University (Ohio) – both institutions have Confucius Institutes.

On 28 March 2012, the United States House Foreign Affairs Subcommittee on Oversight and Investigations held a hearing on "The Price of Public Diplomacy with China," focusing upon Chinese propaganda efforts in the U.S., including Confucius Institutes on university campuses. Representative Dana Rohrabacher said, "The two pillars of America's status as an open society are freedom of the press and academic freedom. Communist China, which does not believe in or allows the practice of either type of freedom, is exploiting the opportunities offered by America to penetrate both private media and public education to spread its state propaganda." Steven W. Mosher testified, "there have been allegations of Confucius Institutes undermining academic freedom at host universities, engaging in industrial and military espionage, monitoring the activities of Chinese students abroad, and attempting to advance the Chinese Party-State's political agenda on such issues as the Dalai Lama and Tibet, Taiwan independence, the pro-democracy movement abroad, and dissent within China itself." Responding to Mosher's testimony, Rohrabacher argued, "It appears as though Beijing is able to expand its campaign against academic freedom from China to America when U.S. universities value Chinese favors and money more than truth and integrity."

The US Department of State issued a 17 May 2012 directive stating that the Chinese professors at university-based CIs were violating their J-1 visas by teaching in schools at the precollege level and would have to return to China by 30 June to apply for a new visa. In addition, the institutes would be required to obtain US academic accreditation. Chinese officials reportedly applied pressure on Washington in response. On 24 May, State Department spokesperson Victoria Nuland said there was "a mess-up in the processing in general" and called the original directive "sloppy and incomplete". The State Department said it would arrange the appropriate visa categories for Chinese teachers, without them needing to leave the country and re-apply. Xu Lin, head of the Hanban, told a CI conference in Edinburgh, "The US government hurt our feelings, but Confucius Institutes across Europe have done a great job, especially with cultural promotion, which is not surprising given Europe's rich history and culture."

In April 2014, over 100 professors at the University of Chicago signed a petition calling for a University Senate Council vote against renewing the university's CI contract, saying that the Hanban's control of hiring and training teachers "subjects the university's academic program to the political constraints on free speech and belief that are specific to the People's Republic of China." The CI director Dali Yang denied these charges and said, "Our Confucius Institute does not offer classes of its own; the teachers participate in the University of Chicago Chinese language program." Marshall Sahlins said that if the U. of C. withdrew from the Confucius Institutes, other universities "will think twice about joining or renewing their contracts".

Media widely reported on this protest by U. of C. faculty. Historian Bruce Cumings, who signed the petition, noted that China had recently fired prominent faculty members for their political views, and warned, "American universities should not be taking money or institute funds from governments that are jailing professors and that do not provide academic freedom in their own country." Anthony C. Yu, a professor emeritus of Chinese, recalled speaking at a large gathering of CI teachers employed on American campuses, and finding most weren't trained language instructors and only a few were fluent in English. When George Washington University announced the establishment of a CI in 2013, a dean supported the program because the University of Chicago had also started one, but following the recent petition there, GW is changing the Faculty Code to protect academic freedom, particularly for professors studying Chinese policy, who could have cause to fear censorship by the Confucius Institute.

On 25 September 2014, the University of Chicago stated that they had suspended negotiations to renew its CI contract because "recently published comments about UChicago in an article about the director-general of Hanban are incompatible with a continued equal partnership." This referred to Xu Lin's interview with the Jiefang Daily, the official newspaper of the Communist Party in Shanghai. The article states that following the UChicago faculty petition, Xu Lin wrote a letter to Chicago's president and called the university representative in Beijing (where Chicago has a research center), "with only one line: 'If your school decides to withdraw, I will agree to it.' Her attitude made the other side anxious. The school quickly responded that it will continue to properly manage the Confucius Institute." Hanban Vice Director Hu Zhiping responded to Chicago's decision with a written statement: "Hanban thinks it's a pity that the University of Chicago has made the public statement before finding out the truth. Since Confucius Institute is a collaboration program, both sides can make a choice." Dali Yang, the Chicago CI director, said the institute would continue to support existing projects after the current five-year agreement expired on 29 September.

Several UChicago faculty members commented on the CI closure. Bruce Lincoln, Professor of the History of Religions at Chicago, summarized the lengthy negotiations; the university administrators "accurately represented the institution's core values" when they argued against having a CI on campus, while the Chinese officials were "heavy-handed, condescending, and difficult". Marshall Sahlins, an emeritus professor who helped lead the fight against the CI, said the newspaper article "fulsomely" praised Xu Lin, and told The Wall Street Journal, "They knew that this was a dubious operation to begin with. They knew that there was a large opposition from an important segment of the faculty. And then, given that, the newspaper report simply triggered or changed the balance definitively."

Gary Rawnsley, a British expert on international communication, said that Xu Lin could not have picked a worse time "to assert her imaginary authority", and the Business Spectator concluded this hardline behavior highlights one of the biggest problems for Beijing's charm offensive. "It still relies on officials like Xu, who still think and act like party ideologues who like to assert their authority and bully people into submission."

The Economist called Xu Lin's statement "a boastful challenge" and said opponents of Confucius Institutes will claim this as a victory for academic freedom. The Diplomat said that the current CI program of 465 institutes is heavily weighted toward the West, with 97 located in the U.S. but only 95 institutes in all of Asia. However, if backlash in the West continues to grow, the number of CIs "may plateau in the West while there remains immense potential for growth in other regions", including Africa, the Middle East, and Latin America. The official newspaper of the Communist party, the People's Daily responded to the University of Chicago's closure of its Confucius Institute.

On 1 October 2014, Pennsylvania State University confirmed that it would close its Confucius Institute on 13 December 2014 when the contract expires, with its dean saying through a written statement that several of the university's goals are "not consistent with those of the Office of Chinese Languages Council International, known as the Hanban, which provides support to Confucius Institutes throughout the world."

In an interview, a former director of the Penn State Confucius Institute, Eric Hayot, said he suspected that the Confucius Institute may not have been providing enough of a return on its investment. "I will say that in my experience as CI director one of the major frustrations with the relationship was that we consistently had more ambitious ideas for the ways CI funding could be used", such as research projects proposed by Penn State professors on topics concerning the environment, science, and politics. He said the Hanban regularly rejected such proposals "too far outside the official CI ambit (which they would tell us was mainly 'cultural')," "A lot of what the Hanban wanted us to do didn't make sense given our institution, faculty population, and student population," said Professor Hayot, who was not involved in the CI contract negotiations this summer. "Had they been flexible, it would have helped Confucius Institute succeed here."

The Telegraph said China's effort to project soft power "has suffered another serious setback", and the UChicago and Penn State closures represent a major blow to China's attempt at using the government-funded institutes to improve its image around the world.

Henry Reichman, a vice president of the AAUP and chairman of the committee that issued a statement condemning Confucius Institutes, said, "There is clearly a growing sense that these academic centers need to be looked at a little more carefully ... I suspect U Chicago and Penn State won't be the only ones to come to the conclusion that a relationship with these institutes is not really worth it."

A Bloomberg News editorial mentioned the three CI closures within two weeks and says, "If the institutes are meant to be insidious vehicles of Chinese soft-power indoctrination, they're doing a terrible job. In fact, they appear to be causing more damage than good to China's image abroad."

On 4 December 2014, the United States House Foreign Affairs Subcommittee on Africa, Global Health, Global Human Rights and International Organizations held a hearing entitled "Is Academic Freedom Threatened by China's Influence on U.S. Universities?". Chairman Chris Smith said, "U.S. colleges and universities should not be outsourcing academic control, faculty and student oversight or curriculum to a foreign government", and called for a Government Accountability Office study into academic agreements between American universities and China. The testimony of Perry Link, a Chinese studies professor at UC Riverside, made three policy recommendations: American university administrators should adopt a policy of "consciously staking out the broadest of fields" in their programs with China, the U.S. government should fund Chinese-language programs in the U.S., and should withhold visas for CI instructors as long as China continues to withhold visas for American scholars on political grounds. On the day after the House hearing, PRC Ministry of Foreign Affairs spokeswoman Hua Chunying responded, "All Confucius Institutes in the U.S. are there because they were applied for by U.S. universities of their own will. We have assisted with supplying teachers and textbooks at the request of the U.S. side but have never interfered with academic freedom."

The John McCain National Defense Authorization Act for Fiscal Year 2019 prohibits the use of Department of Defense funds for Chinese language instruction provided by Confucius Institutes.

In August 2020, the United States Department of State designated the headquarters of the Confucius Institutes in the U.S. as a "foreign mission" of China.

The United States National Defense Authorization Act for Fiscal Year 2021 withheld federal research funds from colleges and universities that had Confucius Institutes.

As of 2022, all of the Confucius Institutes located on SUNY campuses were closed because federal research funding was jeopardized.

In October 2023, there were less than five CIs at U.S. universities and colleges compared to 2019, when there were 100.

=== United Kingdom ===
In Britain, there are at least 29 Confucius Institutes, the second largest number in the world after the United States, attached to major universities such as Edinburgh, Liverpool, Manchester, Newcastle, Nottingham, Cardiff and University College London. There are also 148 Confucius 'classrooms' in schools around the United Kingdom, according to the Hanban website. As part of its wider and ongoing work on China, the Conservative Party Human Rights Commission held an inquiry into China's Confucius Institutes in February 2019. "This inquiry asked the fundamental question: Are Confucius Institutes a benign and even positive presence, enhancing better understanding and cooperation with China, or a negative influence, threatening and restricting freedom of expression and academic freedom? Our conclusion is that on balance, given the evidence we have received, and while the teaching of Chinese language and culture should be welcomed and encouraged, Confucius Institutes as they are currently constituted threaten academic freedom and freedom of expression in universities around the world and represent an endeavour by the Chinese Communist Party to spread its propaganda and suppress its critics beyond its borders." In 2023, there were 30 CIs on campuses in the UK, which were not forced to close but in May 2024 lost all direct and indirect government funding.

=== Israel ===
In 2008, Tel Aviv University officials shut down a student art exhibition depicting the "oppression of Falun Gong" in China. A Tel Aviv District Court judge subsequently ruled the university "violated freedom of expression and succumbed to pressure from the Chinese Embassy." The judge noted the dean of students "feared that the art exhibit would jeopardize Chinese support for its Confucius Institute and other educational activities."

=== Australia ===
New South Wales Greens MP John Kaye said that although teaching Chinese language and culture is important, "Students are being denied a balanced curriculum which explores controversial issues, such as human rights violations and Taiwan, because critical examination might upset the Chinese government." Fellow Greens MP Jamie Parker organized a petition with more than 10,000 signatures, calling for removing the Confucius Classroom Program from local schools. NSW Minister for Education Adrian Piccoli defended the classes, and noted the Chinese language syllabuses did not include the study of political content. Shuangyuan Shi, director of Confucius Institute in Sydney, noted the institute primarily focuses on language, and teachers are not there to draw conclusions for students in regards to controversial subjects. Senior Department of Education officials acknowledge the institutes play an important role in fostering greater literacy in Asian languages, they admit to concerns about China's influence over the program's content. They say that the treatment of "sensitive topics" such as human rights is usually well handled by teachers. Furthermore, the staff at the Sydney institutes noted Beijing never threatened their academic freedom.

After the University of Sydney's Institute for Democracy and Human Rights organized a 2013 talk by the Dalai Lama, the university warned that they could not use its logo, allow media coverage, or permit entry to the event by Tibet activists—forcing organizers to move the event off campus. University officials decided, "there was a better way of doing it. A small group, a small section of the student body, was really not the best thing." Sarah Hanson-Young, an Australian Greens senator, said "As a democratic country, we should be encouraging more open and frank discussion about the current situation in Tibet, not banning the country's spiritual leader from addressing students and staff at universities." A spokesperson for the activist Australia Tibet Council said the university had given in to China. "They have compromised their academic freedom and integrity, and it also sends a disheartening message to the Tibetan people," more than 100 of whom have died in recent self-immolation protests. June Teufel Dreyer, a University of Miami (Florida) professor of political science, claims that Confucius Institutes have distorted history, citing universities in Australia inviting speakers "to shill for the government and talk about how happy all the Tibetans were". A Joint Conference of Australia's 13 Confucius Institutes was held in Sydney on 4 September 2014, intending to increase the CI network's "visibility in Australia's industry and public policy making communities".

The RMIT University closed its CI in 2021, which was followed by closures at the UNSW in 2022, the University of Western Australia in 2023, the University of Melbourne in 2024 as well as the University of Queensland in 2024.

=== Canada ===
In December 2013, the Canadian Association of University Teachers passed a resolution calling on all Canadian universities and colleges that currently host CIs on their campuses to cease doing so, and those contemplating such arrangements to pursue them no further. This action followed upon the Université de Sherbrooke in Quebec closing its Confucius Institute, the University of Manitoba voting against hosting a CI out of concerns over political censorship, and McMaster University cancelling its CI contract following an instructor's human rights complaint. CAUT executive director James Turk said Canadian universities that agree to host CIs are compromising their own integrity by allowing the Hanban to have a voice in academic matters such as curriculum, texts, and topics of class discussion, describing such interference as a "fundamental violation of academic freedom". Turk described CIs as "essentially political arms of the Chinese government", which restrict the free discussion of topics Chinese authorities deem controversial, and "should have no place on our campuses".

At 19 June 2014 meeting of the Toronto District School Board, Canada's largest school board, trustees voted to postpone the planned September startup of a Confucius Institute, in order to more closely examine a 2012 agreement that chair Chris Bolton unilaterally negotiated with the Hanban. On the morning of the meeting, Bolton suddenly resigned and was not available to answer questions. Many trustees complained that they had not received enough information about the partnership and were caught off guard when they received hundreds of emails and phone calls from parents protesting against CIs. An editorial in The Globe and Mail said Bolton "showed a stunning lack of judgment", and warned that "the Confucius Institute functions as little more than a long arm of the Chinese state, pushing its political agenda under the guise of simple language instruction." The deputy director-general of the Hunan Provincial Department of Education sent a letter to the TDSB that said, "If the Confucius Institute in Toronto was suspended, there would be a great damage to the relationship between the two sides, which is hard for us to accept."

On 30 September 2014, the TDSB's Planning and Priorities Committee voted to terminate the Confucius Institute program, leaving the final decision to the full board meeting at the end of October. TDSB chair Mari Rutka declared she did not feel reassured that going forward would be a good move, and said, "There have been too many concerns raised, I think, again, we have the examples of a number of other institutions that have decided not to go on with this." Trustees said they had heard both sides of the argument, and received pressure from both parents alarmed over China's control of the programs and from Chinese officials who warned them that dissolving the partnership would endanger the TDSB's most lucrative market for fee-paying international students. The CI issue has been contentious, involving a website and petitions. The committee heard from 10 speakers, half against the contract (including a former Canadian Security Intelligence Service Asia/Pacific chief who warned the institutes are a "Trojan horse"), and half in favor (a spokesperson from the Confederation of Chinese Canadian Organizations in Toronto who said the issue was not political but "about culture and language"). A newspaper editorial described CIs as state-supported, state-directed entities controlled by a "one-party regime that recently evolved from Marxism-Leninism into what can be best described as a novel form of non-democratic elitism with kleptocratic tendencies."

At the 30 October 2014 full meeting, the TDSB voted 20–2 to cancel the CI contract. Trustee Pamela Gough said her concern was that "the Confucius Institute is directly controlled by the Communist Party of China, and there is irrefutable evidence that the party exerts its influence through [the institute]". In response to the TDSB rejection, an op-ed from the state-run China Daily called the criticisms "unfair" and accused CI critics of having "a deep bias against China". David Mulroney, a former Canadian ambassador to China, said, "We're seeing really the end of the free ride that Confucius Institutes have had, particularly in North America".

=== Scandinavia ===
In December 2014, Stockholm University, the first university in Europe to host a Confucius Institute, announced it was terminating the program. Press coverage of the Braga incident in the Swedish press was said to have influenced the decision. "Generally it is questionable to have, within the framework of the university, institutes that are financed by another country," said the university's chancellor. No major university in Sweden now hosts a Confucius Institute.

=== Portugal ===
A censorship effort by the Confucius Institute's international director Xu Lin against Taiwan occurred in Portugal in July 2014. Upon her arrival on 23 July 2014, at a European Sinology conference partly organized by the director of the Confucius Institute at the University of Minho, Braga, Portugal, the international head of the Confucius Institutes, Xu Lin, ordered censorship of "important pages" that included references to Taiwan institutions, one of which, the Chiang Ching-kuo Foundation, was also funding the conference as it has for the past 20 years.

On the first day of the annual conference of the European Association for Chinese Studies (EACS), with several hundred attendees, Xu Lin ordered the programs seized. Four pages were torn out of the program before they were re-issued to conference attendees the next day.

The president of the EACS ordered 500 copies of the deleted pages to be distributed to attendees and issued a report on the incident. The U.S. online university site Inside Higher Ed quoted Marshall Sahlins, professor emeritus at the University of Chicago and a leading critic of the Confucius Institutes, who said that this incident illustrated the Confucius Institutes provision that programming they fund must abide by Chinese laws, including those restricting speech; "Moreover they're going to enforce them the way they do in China, which is not so much by going to court... but simply by fiat." Taiwan's cabinet-level Mainland Affairs Council issued a reproach over the censorship incident, saying, "The mainland should deal with Taiwan's participation in activities on international occasions pragmatically. If there is no respect for each other, the development of cross-strait relations will be seriously hurt."

The Christian Science Monitor reported that the censorship has made more academics in the US, UK, Canada, and Australia grow uneasy with Confucius Institutes. Eamonn Fingleton suggests that perhaps the most embarrassing aspect of the whole Braga Incident is that Beijing has reversed itself on the "hot-button issue at the center of the entire controversy. After vehemently denying for years that the Confucius Institutes have any kind of censorship agenda, Beijing has now tacitly acknowledged that this was false."

The Parliament Magazine said of the Braga Incident that European higher education should remain independent and not be turned into "an instrument of outright propaganda of the Chinese Communist party."

In December 2014, the BBC interviewed Xu Lin in Beijing. During the interview, BBC reporter John Sudworth asked about the Braga incident, but afterwards Xu Lin objected and insisted that large portions of the interview to be deleted. The BBC refused the Chinese censorship demand. One of the points she made in the interview is that Taiwan belongs to China, and therefore outsiders have no business interfering. "Xu Lin not only refused to answer difficult questions, she also politicised the Confucius Institutes and reinforced the idea that they are led by dogmatists," commented Gary Rawnsley, professor of Public Diplomacy at Aberystwyth University, Wales. The Wall Street Journal reported on Xu's BBC interview, and said, "Critics have argued that China's Confucius Institutes pose a threat to academic freedom in the United States, Canada, Europe and beyond. Now the Beijing official in charge of them has confirmed it."

=== Russia ===
On 27 July 2015, a prosecutor filed a complaint to the city court in Blagoveshchensk Amur Oblast, Russia, asking that the court shut down the Blagoveschensk State Pedagogical University Confucius Institute on the grounds that it is violating Russian law by not being registered as a non-commercial organization, and thus, foreign teachers have no legal grounds to work at the institute. The prosecutor's statement said that instead of being a part of the university, the CI should be registered as a foreign cultural center.

== Confucius Classrooms ==
The Confucius Classroom program partners with local secondary schools or school districts to provide teachers and instructional materials.

=== United Kingdom ===
Campaign groups raised concerns about Confucius Classrooms in the UK in 2015. Isabel Hilton, a broadcaster and writer whose own work was censored by the Confucius Institute, said: "State control undertaking in China in the teaching of culture means contestation is not really allowed. If this is happening in our schools where people are not familiar with the Chinese buying their way into our education system, we ought to ask serious questions about whether that's a good thing." Campaigning group Free Tibet claimed that lessons are limited by "terms effectively determined by a government that suppresses free speech inside its own borders and which is responsible for widespread human rights abuses". The group also raised concerns that money from the Chinese government had been accepted without "proper, democratic scrutiny".

=== United States ===
In one instance, the Hacienda La Puente Unified School District Board of Education encountered strong community opposition to establishing a Confucius Classroom at Cedarlane middle school in Hacienda Heights, which is "a heavily Hispanic community with a majority-Chinese school board." A San Gabriel Valley Tribune editorial compared this CI program as "tantamount of asking Hugo Chavez to send his cadres to teach little American kids economics." History teacher Jane Shults described criticisms of Confucius Classrooms as "jingoistic, xenophobic, not overly rational and it's really shades of McCarthyism." One member of the Hacienda La Puente school board, Norman Hsu, said it wasn't worth pushing the issue, since, without California credentials, the teacher would not have been permitted to operate as a full-fledged instructor anyway. Another school board member, Jay Chen, characterized the Confucius Classroom scheme's opponents, "What they all share in common, besides not having any children in the district (many don't even live in the district), are steadfast accusations that the school board is trying to promote Communism in the classroom." Chen concluded that xenophobic "Anti-Sinoism" was causing the Hacienda La Puente disagreements. University of Southern California public diplomacy professor Nicholas J. Cull said, "I'm sure this will become a standard dispute. People in America are very suspicious of ideas from the outside."

The Bibb County Public School District, which includes Macon, Georgia, mandated that Mandarin Chinese would become a required subject for every student, pre-K through 12th grade. Although the superintendent described the agreement for the Confucius Classroom to supply the Chinese language teachers as "a win-win for everyone", some parents were critical. A few feared a "Communist regime enacting its geopolitical agenda on their children", but most had practical concerns, such as whether local students would benefit more from learning Spanish than Chinese as a foreign language.

David Coleman (education) president of the College Board announced plans with Hanban to open Confucius Classrooms in 20 school districts across the U.S.

== Hiring policies ==
In 2011, the instructor hiring policies posted publicly on Hanban's website stated that candidates for teaching positions should be "aged between 22 and 60, physical and mental [sic] healthy, no record of participation in Falun Gong and other illegal organizations, and no criminal record". Hanban representatives in North America defended the policy, stating that Confucius Institutes must follow Chinese law.

In 2012, The Globe and Mail reported that Sonia Zhao quit her teaching position at McMaster University's Confucius Institute in Hamilton, Ontario, and sought political asylum in Canada based on religious discrimination. In a complaint filed to the Human Rights Tribunal of Ontario, Ms. Zhao stated she was forced to hide her belief in the Falun Gong spiritual movement, which the Chinese government calls an illegal "evil cult", and argued that McMaster "is giving legitimization to discrimination". She told an interviewer that during her CI training in Beijing, she was told that if students asked about Tibet or other sensitive topics, "Don't talk about this. If the student insists, you just try to change the topic, or say something the Chinese Communist Party would prefer." Andrea Farquhar, McMaster's assistant vice-president of public and government affairs, said the university was "looking for clarity" from its Chinese partners on aspects of their agreement, notably hiring practices. Having lent its name to the Confucius Institute on its campus, Ms. Farquhar said McMaster was insisting that Canadian laws and expectations be respected. In 2013, McMaster University announced they would close their Confucius Institute. Andrea Farquhar explained that after months of making a concerted effort to save their 5-year partnership with Hanban, "We were uncomfortable, and felt that it didn't reflect the way the university would do hiring", and explained that McMaster's Chinese partners replied with a letter expressing "some disappointment". Ms. Zhao, a Chinese citizen, has since been granted refugee status in Canada.

== Closures ==
While many universities (such as the University of Pennsylvania and University of Manitoba) have refused Hanban offers to host Confucius Institutes, a few hosting universities have decided to terminate their 5-year renewable CI contracts: one Japanese university in 2010, one French and two Canadian in 2013, one Canadian, one Swedish, and two American universities in 2014, and one German university in 2015. Regarding the recent international closures of Confucius Institutes, a July 2015 article in The Diplomat said that although nations like Japan use soft power to promote positive images of themselves for the sake of political profit, China uses soft power for lies and censorship, but the world "sees through its con".

=== McMaster University ===
On 7 February 2013, Canada's McMaster University terminated its CI contract owing to an instructor's human rights complaint and the university's lack of control over hiring CI employees. The Hanban replied with a letter expressing "some disappointment". In the previous year, Sonia Zhao, a Chinese national, quit her teaching position at McMaster's Confucius Institute and sought political asylum in Canada based on religious discrimination. Ms. Zhao filed a complaint with the Human Rights Tribunal of Ontario, stating that McMaster was "giving legitimization to discrimination" because she was forced to hide her belief in the Falun Gong spiritual movement, for which the Hanban would fire her. The university insisted that the Confucius Institute respect Canadian laws and expectations on hiring and firing practices.

=== University of Lyon ===
On 24 September 2013, France's University of Lyon closed their Confucius Institute at Lumière University Lyon 2 and Jean Moulin University Lyon 3, which had been established in 2009. Gregory B. Lee, board chair of the CI said its director was "taking his instructions directly from Beijing" and "questioned the content of our courses".

=== Université de Sherbrooke ===
On 31 December 2013, Canada's Université de Sherbrooke in Quebec closed their Confucius Institute after months of failed negotiations, saying that the Hanban arrangement no longer met the university's international plans. On 17 December 2013, the Canadian Association of University Teachers passed a resolution calling on all Canadian universities and colleges that currently host CIs on their campuses to cease doing so, and those contemplating such arrangements to pursue them no further. Of the six Canadian universities that sent replies to the CAUT, only the Université de Sherbrooke said it would be severing ties with the CI.

Montreal's Dawson College, which partnered with Université de Sherbrooke in 2007 to establish the Confucius Institute in Quebec, decided to continue hosting. Agents from the Canadian Security Intelligence Service interviewed Meng Rong, director of the CI in Quebec, showed her a list of names, and asked if she could identify anyone. Meng told an interviewer that the CI had "nothing to do with politics or spying".

=== University of Chicago ===
On 25 September 2014, the University of Chicago suspended lengthy negotiations to renew its Confucius Institute contract, citing director-general Xu Lin's boastful claims in the official Communist Jiefang Daily that she made the university fear cancelling with one sentence—"If your school decides to withdraw, I will agree to it."

=== Pennsylvania State University ===
On 1 October 2014, Pennsylvania State University announced that it will discontinue hosting a Confucius Institute at the end of the year when their contract expires. The university spokesperson said their goals are not consistent with those of the Hanban, or Office of Chinese Languages Council International.

=== Toronto District School Board ===
On 30 October 2014, the Toronto District School Board, which oversees public schools with 232,000 students, voted to cancel their CI contract. Trustee Pamela Gough said it was clear that "this partnership is not aligned with TDSB and community values, and its continuation is not appropriate."

=== Stockholm University ===
On 20 December 2014 Stockholm University, Sweden, announced that the Stockholm Confucius Institute will be closed by the end of June 2015. According to the vice-chancellor of Stockholm University the new contracts for the Confucius Institutes are not in line with how Swedish universities are governed.

=== Stuttgart Media University and University of Hohenheim ===
In 2014, the Hanban signed a contract with the Stuttgart Media University and University of Hohenheim to open a CI in Stuttgart, Germany, but in June 2015, the universities abandoned the plan. A spokesperson blamed the decision on a failure to find the necessary support for the Confucius Institute, nonetheless, a Students for a Free Tibet press release said their "Say No to Confucius Institutes" campaign's opposition to the Stuttgart plan had been successful, and declared a victory for democratic values and academic freedom worldwide.

=== Tulane University ===
In 2013, Tulane entered into an agreement with East China Normal University to create a Confucius Institute. After 2018, the institute no longer exists at Tulane.

== List of closures ==
Country	Institution	Year of Cutting ties
Canada	McMaster University	2013
Canada	Université de Sherbrooke	2013
Canada	Toronto District School Board	2014
Canada	New Brunswick provincial government	2019
Canada	British Columbia Institute of Technology	2019
Canada	Brock University	2020
United States	University of Chicago	2014
United States	Pennsylvania State University	2014
United States	Pfeiffer University	2016
United States	Tulane University	2017
United States	University of Illinois-Urbana Champaign	2017
United States	University of West Florida	2018
United States	Texas A&M University System	2018
United States	Prairie View A&M University	2018
United States	University of Iowa	2018
United States	University of North Florida	2018
United States	North Carolina State University	2018
United States	University of Michigan	2018
United States	University of Rhode Island	2018
United States	University of South Florida	2018
United States	University of Massachusetts Boston	2019
United States	University of Minnesota	2019
United States	Indiana University	2019
United States	Western Kentucky University	2019
United States	University of Oregon	2019
United States	San Francisco State University	2019
United States	University of Montana	2019
United States	University of Hawaii at Mānoa	2019
United States	San Diego State University	2019
United States	Arizona State University	2019
United States	Kansas State University	2019
United States	University of Delaware	2020
United States	University of Kansas	2020
United States	University of Maryland	2020
United States	University of Alaska, Anchorage	2020
United States	New Mexico State University	2020
United States	University of Missouri	2020
United States	University of Arizona	2020
United States	Miami University (Ohio)	2020
United States	University of California, Davis (UC Davis)	2020
United States	University of Pittsburgh	2020
United States	California State University - Long Beach	2020
United States	University of Oklahoma	2020
United States	University of Memphis	2020
United States	Portland State University	2021
United States	Tufts University	2021
United States	George Washington University	2021
Australia	NSW government (Confucius Classroom)	2019
France	University of Lumière Lyon 2	2013
France	University of Jean Moulin Lyon 3	2013
France	Toulouse 1 University Capitole	2017
France	West Paris Nanterre La Defense University	2018
Sweden	Stockholm University	2014
Sweden	Karlstad University	2015
Sweden	Blekinge Institute of Technology	2015
Sweden	Luleå University of Technology	2020
Germany	Stuttgart Media University	2015
Germany	University of Hohenheim	2015
Germany	University of Düsseldorf	2020
Germany	University of Hamburg	2020
Denmark	Copenhagen Business School	2017
Netherlands	Leiden University	2019
Belgium	Free University of Brussels-VUB	2019
Switzerland	University of Basel	2020
