= Taiwan Center for Mandarin Learning =

Chinese language learning Institutes

Taiwan Center for Mandarin Learning (Chinese: 臺灣華語文學習中心; pinyin: Táiwān huáyǔ wén xuéxí zhōngxīn) is a project initiated and funded by the government of the Republic of China (Taiwan) to establish learning centres in foreign countries to teach students Mandarin Chinese with "Taiwanese characteristics". The project was announced in June 2021 with plans to establish centres in various places in the United States and Europe.

== Background ==
Confucius Institutes (CIs) are a program promoted by the government of the People's Republic of China (PRC) to spread Chinese language learning and culture overseas, including in the United States. They have been criticized as being political tools of the government of China to promote the official views of the PRC and suppress alternative views. The US government has labeled CIs as a foreign mission and cut government funding to universities that host them. In December 2020, the US government announced a partnership with Taiwan called the "U.S.-Taiwan Education Initiative" in order to help Taiwan promote Mandarin learning in the United States and around the world.

BBC News reported that the US government is giving preference to Mandarin learning facilitated by Taiwan rather than by the PRC as the former has "no strings attached".

== Centers ==
The program was launched in June 2021. As of 2025, a total of 88 centers have been established, with 68 in the United States and 20 in Europe (4 in the U.K.,3 in Germany and Italy, 2 in France, and 1 each in Austria, Belgium, Czech Republic, Hungary, Ireland, the Netherlands, Poland, Spain, and Sweden).

== See also ==
- Istituto Italiano di Cultura
- Dante Alighieri Society
- Goethe-Institut
- Hillel International
- Instituto Camões
- Instituto Cervantes
- Institut Français
- Criticism of Confucius Institutes
- Taiwan Academy
