= Soft power of China =

The soft power of the People's Republic of China is the indirect and non-military influence of the country that can be observed outside the country around the world. While soft power as a concept can be summarized as "get others to do your bidding" without resorting to hard power, it has been argued that the People's Republic of China uses a different approach (especially in developed countries) to "get others to stop harming your image" which is more in line with its domestic policies.

== Soft power rankings ==
China ranked 2nd out of 110 countries in the Elcano Global Presence Report for 2018 by the Elcano Royal Institute. The report noted that China's Reputation ranking (24th) was considerably lower than its Influence ranking (2nd).

According to the 2019 Asia Power Index, China takes the lead in diplomatic influence and ranks 2nd out of 25 countries in cultural influence after the US.

China's ranked 27th out of 30 nations in the Soft Power 30 index for 2018 and 2019 published by Portland Communications and the USC Center on Public Diplomacy. According to the index, China is a "cultural juggernaut", being ranked 8th in the Culture category and 10th in the Engagement category.

China is ranked 3rd out of 193 nations in the Global Soft Power Index 2024 published by Brand Finance, a brand evaluation consultancy. Its rise faster than any other nation brand in the Index.

== Global influence and diplomacy ==
China's traditional culture has been a source of attraction, building on which it has created several hundred Confucius Institutes around the world to teach its language and culture. The enrollment of foreign students in China has increased from 36,000 a decade ago to at least 240,000 in 2010. China is the most popular country in Asia for international students, the second most popular destination for African students after France, and the second most popular education power house in the world. China's Asian Infrastructure Investment Bank has attracted many western countries to join. Increasing political pressure and scrutiny around the Confucius Institutes have led to some closures.

China has the largest diplomatic network in the world, overtaking the US in 2019.

A spring 2014 Global Attitudes survey from Pew Research Center states China receives mostly positive reviews in the sub-Saharan African nations polled, although South Africans are closely divided (45% favorable, 40% unfavorable).

Chinese soft power in the Middle East countries has been expanding since the beginning of the millennium, and includes many efforts in the fields of education, journalism, and popular culture.

The use of Chinese medical aid during the COVID-19 pandemic has been dubbed "face-mask diplomacy".

China leveraged the 2022 Winter Olympics to promote and expand its grandiose Belt and Road Initiative (BRI). While the world was transfixed on the Olympic competitions, countless delegations of international politicians traveled to Beijing to meet privately with Chinese officials in order to carve out trade agreements that would allow their respective countries to become part of the BRI enterprise.

In recent years, Chinese video games have become one of the main vehicles for exporting Chinese culture overseas. For example, one-third of the top 100 mobile games in Japan came from China in 2022, according to Niko Partners. Gaming companies like Tencent have become instruments for China to exert soft power, acquiring shares in major video game companies and embedding Chinese cultural elements into games to promote China's influence globally. In 2025, China was noted for its use of paid trips for foreign influencers as part of a soft power strategy.

== See also ==
- Hard power
- Cultural hegemony
- Cool Japan
- Chinese Dream
- China's peaceful rise
- Confucius Institute
- International communication center
