= Braga incident =

2014 academic scandal

The Braga incident was a 2014 academic scandal in which Xu Lin, the Director-General (zhǔrèn 主任) of the Hanban and Chief Executive (zǒnggànshi 总干事) of the Confucius Institute Headquarters ordered her staff to remove pages referring to Taiwanese academic institutions from the published program for the European Association for Chinese Studies July–August conference in Braga, Portugal, claiming the materials were "contrary to Chinese regulations", which The Wall Street Journal described as the "bullying approach to academic freedom". The incident led to renewed criticism of Confucius Institutes.

== Removal of material ==
On 22 July, the evening before the start of the European Association of Chinese Studies (EACS) conference in Braga, Portugal, Xu Lin removed four pages from the conference program and one page from the abstracts, which referred to Taiwan's Chiang Ching-kuo Foundation for International Scholarly Exchange, a major sponsor of the conference for the past 20 years. The EACS protested and reprinted all the deleted materials for distribution to all conference members. Roger Greatrex, president of the EACS, subsequently issued a report on the page deletions, and an official letter of protest that concluded, "Such interference in the internal organization of the international conference of an independent and democratically organized non-profitable academic organization is totally unacceptable."

Conference registration began on 22 July, and about 100 participants received complete copies of the abstracts and program, which comprised 89 pages, including the cover and front matter. However, after Xu Lin, who was a keynote speaker, arrived that evening, she proclaimed that any mention of the Confucius China Studies Program (CCSP) sponsorship be removed from the Conference Abstracts, and ordered her entourage from Confucius Institute Headquarters to remove all conference materials and take them to the apartment of a local CI teacher. When the remaining 300 participants arrived for conference registration on 23 July, they did not receive the printed abstracts or programs but only a brief summarized schedule. After last-minute negotiations between Xu Lin and conference organizers to ensure conference members received the program, a compromise was made to allow the removal of one abstract page that mentioned the CCSP support of the conference.

On the morning of 24 July, the remaining 300 conference participants received their materials, which were now missing four printed pages: the frontispiece mentioning CCSP sponsorship in the conference abstract, and three pages from the conference program. These expurgated pages contained information of the book exhibition and library donation organized by the Taiwan National Central Library, and the Chiang Ching-kuo Foundation for International Scholarly Exchange. The director of the National Central Library stated that EACS officials and members had spoken out against Xu during the opening ceremony.

== Reaction ==
Marshall Sahlins, an American cultural anthropologist, said that the EACS censorship brings to light the Hanban's seriousness in enforcing its contractual provisions "the way they do in China which is not so much by going to court ... but simply by fiat". The Christian Science Monitor said that the Hanban/CI censorship has made more American, European, and Australian academics grow uneasy with CIs, and reported that when Ms. Xu met privately with foreign scholars in Shanghai, who asked specifically about the missing pages, "she denied ordering them censored."

In December, the BBC interviewed Xu Lin in Beijing. When the interviewer brought up the Braga incident, Xu Lin objected and later asked for large portions of the interview to be deleted. One of the points she made in the interview is that Taiwan belongs to China, and therefore outsiders have no business interfering. The BBC did not agree to the censorship demand. "Xu Lin not only refused to answer difficult questions, she also politicised the Confucius Institutes and reinforced the idea that they are led by dogmatists," commented Gary Rawnsley, professor of Public Diplomacy at Aberystwyth University, Wales. The Wall Street Journal reported on Xu's BBC interview, and said, "Critics have argued that China’s Confucius Institutes pose a threat to academic freedom in the United States, Canada, Europe and beyond. Now the Beijing official in charge of them has confirmed it."

=== Universities withdraw from program ===
The University of Chicago, Pennsylvania State University, and the Toronto District School Board left in 2014.

In December, Stockholm University, the first university in Europe to host a Confucius Institute, announced it was terminating the program. Press coverage of the Braga incident in the Swedish press was said to have influenced the decision. "Generally it is questionable to have, within the framework of the university, institutes that are financed by another country," said the university's chancellor.

== See also ==
- Overseas censorship of Chinese issues
