= Xu Lin (Hanban) =

Chinese politician

- Traditional Chinese: 許琳
- Simplified Chinese: 许琳
Transcriptions
Standard Mandarin
- Hanyu Pinyin: Xǔ Lín
- Wade–Giles: Hsü³ Lin²

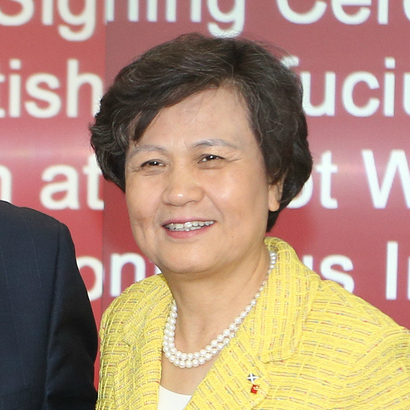
Xu Lin in 2013

Xu Lin (born September 1954) is a Chinese vice-minister-level official serving on the State Council. She has held the post of Chief Executive and Director of the Confucius Institutes worldwide since 2004. She is Director General of the Hanban, or Chinese National Office for Teaching Chinese as a Foreign Language.

Xu Lin was born in Shanxi province. She is a graduate of Fudan University in Shanghai with a degree in Chemistry and has a master's degree in Economics from Beijing Normal University. As a young woman during the Cultural Revolution, she was a worker at the Changzhi Bicycle Factory (长治自行车厂) in Shanxi. According to her resume, she then worked as a lecturer in the Chemistry Department at Shanxi University, staff at the Higher Education Bureau of Shanxi, and choreographer at the Central Educational Film Studio. Subsequently, she worked in the Finance Department of the Ministry of Education of the People's Republic of China. During this time she also held the post of Assistant Mayor of Xuchang, Henan province (October 1991-September 1993) and then Director of the Foreign Loans Office of the Ministry of Education. In 2000 Xu Lin became the Education Counsellor at the Chinese Consulate in Vancouver, Canada. She returned to China in 2004 and took her current post as head of Hanban, or the Chinese National Office for Teaching Chinese as a Foreign Language.

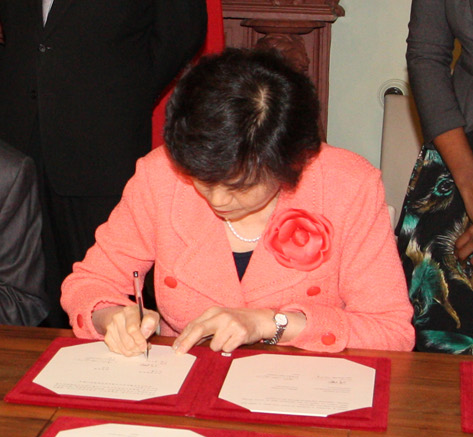
Xu Lin at a signing ceremony in London, 17 April 2012 of the agreement between Confucius Institute and Bangor University

She has received honorary degrees from the University of Arizona, the University of Antananarivo in Madagascar, the University of Edinburgh, Middle Tennessee State University, Western Kentucky University, J.F. Oberlin University in Japan, Chulalongkorn University in Thailand, Belarusian State University in Minsk, Belarus, and Veliko Tarnovo University in Bulgaria.

Xu Lin serves as a member of the 12th Chinese People's Political Consultative Conference.

== Braga incident ==
Xu Lin instigated an international incident on 23 July 2014 when she ordered pages of a program of the European Association of Chinese Studies (EACS) conference at the University of Minho torn out in order to remove any reference to Taiwanese institutions. The reason for the censorship was apparently concern that the publicity for independent Taiwan institutions would cast doubt on China's claim to Taiwan. Roger Greatrex, President of the EACS, subsequently issued a report on the deletion of pages from conference materials and a wrote public letter of protest against Hanban's interference. The report detailed the timeline of events concerning Xu Lin's censorship.

The night before the conference began, Xu ordered that pages in the program to which she objected be torn out of the conference abstract and program. Specifically, she objected to the listing of the Chiang Ching-kuo Foundation for International Scholarly Exchange, a Taiwanese organization, which had been a sponsor of the conference for two decades. Sun Lam, conference co-organizer at the University of Minho and director of the Confucius Institute there, had also applied for funding from the Confucius China Studies Program (CCSP), which is administered by the Confucius Institute, and had received €28,040.

The money from the CCSP included the €7,000 cost for printing 400 copies of the conference abstracts; it did not include the cost of printing the conference program, which was paid for by EACS members. The CCSP international conference funding application states, "The conference is regulated by the laws and decrees of both China and the host country, and will not carry out any activities which are deemed to be adverse to the social order." Dr. Lam submitted a draft copy of the program to the CCSP for approval on 4 July 2014, and was told that it looked "splendid" (piàoliang 漂亮).

Conference registration began on 22 July 2014, and about 100 participants received complete copies of the abstracts and program, which comprised 89 pages plus cover and front matter, printed double-sided on 48 pages. However, after Xu Lin arrived that evening, she "issued a mandatory request that mention of the CCSP sponsorship be removed from the Conference Abstracts", and ordered her entourage from Confucius Institute Headquarters to remove all conference materials and take them to the apartment of a local Confucius Institute employee. When the remaining 300 participants arrived for conference registration on 23 July, they did not receive the printed abstracts or programs but only a brief summarized schedule. After last-minute negotiations between Xu Lin and conference organizers to ensure conference members received the program, a compromise was made to allow the removal of one abstract page that mentioned the CCSP support of the conference.

On the morning of 24 July, the remaining 300 conference participants received their materials, which were now missing four printed pages: the frontispiece mentioning CCSP sponsorship in the conference abstract, and three pages from the conference program. These expurgated pages contained information regarding:

- Hanban's Confucius China Studies Program, and recommended restaurants in Braga (15/16)
- the book exhibition and library donation organized by the Taiwan National Central Library as well as other publishers exhibiting books, and Dr. Sun Lam and Ambassador Joao de Deus Ramos, the keynote speaker (19/20, not removed from some copies)
- self-presentation by the Taiwanese Chiang Ching-kuo Foundation for International Scholarly Exchange, which has sponsored EACS conference for over twenty years, and conference activities (59/60).

When Roger Greatrex, president of the EACS, learned of this censorship, he ordered that 500 copies of the original program immediately be printed and distributed to participants. He later wrote, "The seizure of the materials in such an unauthorized manner, after the conference had already begun, was extremely injudicious, and has promoted a negative view of the Confucius Institute Headquarters". The EACS letter of protest said this had been "the first occasion in the history of the EACS that its conference materials have been censored." It concluded, "Such interference in the internal organization of the international conference of an independent and democratically organized non-profitable academic organization is totally unacceptable."

Tseng Shu-hsien (曾淑賢), director-general of the National Central Library, stated that EACS officials and members had spoken out against Xu during the opening ceremony.

The Inside Higher Ed quoted Marshall Sahlins, professor emeritus at the University of Chicago and a leading critic of the Confucius Institutes, who said that this incident highlighted the Confucius Institutes provision that programming they fund must abide by Chinese laws, including those restricting speech; "Moreover they're going to enforce them the way they do in China, which is not so much by going to court... but simply by fiat." Taiwan's cabinet-level Mainland Affairs Council issued a reproach over the censorship incident, saying, "The mainland should deal with Taiwan's participation in activities on international occasions pragmatically. If there is no respect for each other, the development of cross-strait relations will be seriously hurt."

Marshall Sahlins said the EACS censorship brings to light the CI's seriousness in enforcing its contractual provisions, and moreover, "they're going to enforce them the way they do in China which is not so much by going to court ... but simply by fiat".

The Wall Street Journal suggests that this EACS report about the Confucius Institute's "bullying approach to academic freedom" should be a summer reading program for the president of every American university that hosts a CI. The Asahi Shimbun said international scholars were in a "snit" over Xu Lin's attempted censorship, and The Christian Science Monitor reported that the censorship has made more academics in the US, UK, Canada, and Australia grow uneasy with Confucius Institutes.

== University of Chicago CI closure ==
On 25 September 2014, the University of Chicago stated that it had suspended negotiations to renew its CI contract because "recently published comments about UChicago in an article about the director-general of Hanban are incompatible with a continued equal partnership." This apparently referred to Xu Lin's interview with the Jiefang Daily, the official newspaper of the Communist Party in Shanghai, published on 19 September 2014, in which Xu Lin, director of the Hanban, was reported to have intimidated the president of the University of Chicago "with a single sentence" after 100 professors signed a petition to ban the Confucius Institute.

- 许琳直接一封信写给芝加哥大学校长、一个电话打给其驻京代表，只有一句话，"只要你们学校做决定退出，我就同意"。她的态度，让对方着了急，很快答复，校方决定继续办好孔子学院。[Xu Lin immediately sent a letter to the president of the University of Chicago, and made one phone call to its representative in Beijing. She said only one sentence: "The moment your school decides to withdraw, I will agree." Her attitude made the other side nervous, and the school quickly responded that they decided to continue to run the CI properly.]

Compare these two published translations:

- Xu Lin wrote a letter to Chicago's president and called the university representative in Beijing (where Chicago has a research center), "with only one line: 'If your school decides to withdraw, I will agree to it.' Her attitude made the other side anxious. The school quickly responded that it will continue to properly manage the Confucius Institute." (Inside Higher Ed)
- [Xu Lin] sent a letter to the university president saying, "If you want to end the relationship, it's fine with us." That, the article said, "brought panic to the other side, and a quick decision that the university would continue with its Confucius Institute". This demeaning depiction of the university convinced it that an equal partnership was impossible. (China Post)

And these three paraphrases:

- "[Xu Lin] had told the university essentially to quit the partnership if it wanted, which could be construed as a boastful challenge. (The Economist)
- The school said in a statement Thursday that suspension of talks to renew a contract with its Confucius Institute was made in response to recent comments in a Chinese-language newspaper that implied the school had kowtowed to the Chinese government. (The Wall Street Journal)
- According to [the Jiefang Daily] story, University of Chicago administrators became "anxious" at the thought of shutting down the Confucius Institutes and reassured Xu that they wanted to keep it open. (The Diplomat)

In response to the University of Chicago CI closure, the official Chinese People's Daily published "Rejecting Confucius Institutes not helpful to understand China" on 28 September 2014, but with two factual errors. First, closing the Confucius Institute does not mean "Chinese language study in the university would cease soon"; it means the university's Center for East Asian Studies will resume teaching Chinese. Second, without reference either to UChicago's statement, which specifically blamed Xu Lin's remarks, nor to the widespread media coverage of her Jiefang Daily interview, People's Daily said, "Though the university did not detail the reasons behind the suspension, many believed it was linked to the American Association of University Professors' boycott of CI."

Commenting on the "sinister" EACS/Braga incident as well, Gary Rawnsley, a British professor and expert on international diplomacy and communication, wrote, "Xu Lin could not have picked a worse time "to assert her imaginary authority". The Australian Business Spectator, describing the EACS incident as "highly damaging" for China's international image, wrote, "Xu's hardline behaviour highlights one of the biggest problems for Beijing's charm offensive. It still relies on officials like Xu, who still think and act like party ideologues who like to assert their authority and bully people into submission...Xu Lin... has been a publicity disaster."

In December 2014, the BBC interviewed Xu Lin in Beijing. When the interviewer brought up the Braga incident, Xu Lin objected and later asked for large portions of the interview to be deleted. One of the points she made in the interview is that Taiwan belongs to China, and therefore outsiders have no business interfering. The BBC did not agree to the censorship demand. "Xu Lin not only refused to answer difficult questions, she also politicised the Confucius Institutes and reinforced the idea that they are led by dogmatists," commented Gary Rawnsley, professor of Public Diplomacy at Aberystwyth University, Wales. The Wall Street Journal reported on Xu's BBC interview, and said, "Critics have argued that China's Confucius Institutes pose a threat to academic freedom in the United States, Canada, Europe and beyond. Now the Beijing official in charge of them has confirmed it."
