= Dali Yang =

American political scientist and sinologist

Dali L. Yang
- Born: Dali Yang; China
- Occupations: Political scientist, sinologist

Dali Yang
- Traditional Chinese: 楊大利【力】
- Simplified Chinese: 杨大利【力】
Transcriptions
Standard Mandarin
- Hanyu Pinyin: Yáng Dàlì

Dali L. Yang is an American political scientist and sinologist. He is the William Claude Reavis Professor in the Department of Political Science and faculty director of the University of Chicago Center in Beijing. He was the founding Faculty Director of the UChicago Center in Beijing (2010-2016) and then Senior Advisor to the President and Provost on Global Initiatives at the University of Chicago from 2016 to 2025. He is also a non-resident Senior Fellow at the Chicago Council on Global Affairs. He is a member of the National Committee on U.S.-China Relations, and a member of the China Committee of the Chicago Sister Cities International Program. He is also on the Board of the Paulson Institute at the University of Chicago.

== Education ==
Yang was educated in China and the United States. At age 19, he earned a bachelor of engineering from the University of Science and Technology Beijing in 1983. He taught English in the foreign languages department of his alma mater briefly before coming to the United States. He then switched to political science, earning a master's degree from Portland State University in 1988. He earned a second Master's (1990) and his doctorate in Politics (January 1993) from Princeton University.

== Academic career ==
Since 1992, Yang has been a member of the faculty of the Department of Political Science at the University of Chicago. He became an associate professor in 1999 and a full professor in 2004. From 2004 to 2007, he served as Chairman of the department. From 1999 to 2002 and from 2003 to 2004, he was director of the Committee on International Relations. He served as director of the Center for East Asian Studies at the University of Chicago from 2008 to 2010 and is the founding Faculty Director of the University of Chicago Center in Beijing. He also directed the Confucius Institute at the University of Chicago, an initiative to enhance support for faculty and student research on China (2010–14).

Yang has held visiting appointments at a number of Chinese universities and at the East Asian Institute of the National University of Singapore. He was director and professor of that Institute from 2007 to 2008.

=== Great Chinese Famine and the causes of post-Mao reforms ===
Yang is the author of several of books on modern Chinese history. His earliest book, Calamity and Reform in China, was one of the first scholarly books on the Great Chinese Famine, the worst famine in human history. It shows the radical extremism of the Great Leap Forward under Mao Zedong and how government policies were self-destructive, which ultimately contributed to the post-Mao reforms in rural China. The book was known for its innovative quantitative analysis on the political and economic causes of the Great Chinese Famine at the end of the 1950s and early 1960s. It then revealed the patterns and severity of the famine in the Chinese provinces were linked to the subsequent rural reforms in the 1960s and in the post-Mao reform era.

Yang's study of the political causes of the Great Chinese Famine has stimulated much interest in follow-up studies. Yang and his co-authors returned to the debate in 2014 with a dissection of a study that purported to explain the political radicalism of provincial leaders.

=== Competitive liberalization and limits of Chinese-style federalism ===
Yang is also the author of Beyond Beijing: Liberalization and the Regions in China. This book highlights the politicization of regional policy but argued the severe regional disparities in China could not be easily corrected by the Chinese government. Yang also advanced a theory of "competitive liberalization" to explain how competition among the multitude of local governments helped accelerate some of China's reforms.

However, Yang has parted company with scholars who believed China has evolved into some sort of Federalism, Chinese Style that has played a market-preserving function. In an article in the Annual Review of Political Science and in a paper presented at the Ronald Coase Conference on China's Economic Transformation, Yang has argued one could not use the Market-Preserving Federalism model to explain China's rapid development.

=== China's governance reforms ===
While the proponents of the Chinese-style Federalism theory have been wary of the role of China's central government, Yang has focused much of his energy examining China's governance reforms and the transformation of the Chinese state in a volume edited with Barry Naughton and in his own Remaking the Chinese Leviathan. These studies have allowed Yang to analyze "how China’s leaders have reformed existing institutions and constructed new ones to cope with unruly markets, curb corrupt practices, and bring about a regulated economic order." According to Yang, "the Chinese leadership's emphasis has so far been on order rather than democratic ideals, technocratic control rather than popular participation (except at the grassroots level), governability rather than regime type." The book offers one of the few academic studies of how China made the Chinese People's Liberation Army and other state institutions divest of their business empire. It also made Yang one of the earliest to predict the Chinese leadership was turning around China's once moribund state banking system. These developments meant China was better able to weather the Great Recession that struck in the developed economies in 2008-2009.

How China responded to and coped with the Great Recession is the subject of The Global Recession and China's Political Economy (Yang ed., 2012). Yang and his co-author pay special attention to the phenomenon of "the state sector advances and the private sector retreats" or 国进民退 and discuss how local authorities have invoked central government directives to promote industrial consolidation at the expense of private enterprises.

=== Development of the Chinese regulatory state ===
Yang has in recent years paid attention to the development of China's regulatory system and studied a number of regulatory institutions ranging from sports doping, to drug manufacturing, and food safety. He dissected the tragic failures associated with the State Food and Drug Administration, which ended in the execution of Zheng Xiaoyu, its former commissioner, in 2007. Together with Waikeung Tam, he discussed, in 2005, how China's fragmented regulatory structure contributed to a major baby formula scandal The incidence of the Sanlu milk scandal, which resulted in at least four babies dead and more than 50,000 hospitalized, lent further evidence to their analysis. A recent working paper, The Politics of Blood Safety Regulation in China, is on how the scandalous blood plasma economy in Henan and elsewhere prompted the health authorities to develop a blood safety regulatory regime.

=== China and the COVID-19 Pandemic ===
Yang is the author of Wuhan: How the Covid-19 Outbreak in China Spiraled Out of Control, published by Oxford University Press in 2024.

Yang was frequently quoted in the media in analyses of China's responses to the Covid-19 outbreak/epidemic in Wuhan/Hubei. He highlighted how preoccupation with stability maintenance by the authorities in Wuhan/Hubei contributed to the explosive spread of SARS-CoV-2. Before Covid-19 was declared a pandemic, he said in an interview with the South China Morning Post that the COVID-19 epidemic "will be a crisis of Chernobyl proportions, especially because we will have to contend with the virus for years to come. Those who have sustained losses, in particular, will be asking questions, as has happened before in the aftermath of a crisis." He explained that General Secretary and President Xi Jinping would mobilize all resources to fight the war on the coronavirus in China. He wrote subsequently on "The COVID-19 Pandemic and the Estrangement of US-China Relations." He is known to have written a book manuscript on the themes of "Cognition, Information, and the Politics of the COVID-19 Outbreak in Wuhan, China." He has also published on China's Zero-Covid campaign.

== Books ==
- Wuhan: How the COVID-19 Outbreak in China Spiralled Out of Control . Oxford University Press, 2024.
- Co-author, China and Youth Well-being in China. Routledge, 2019.
- Remaking the Chinese Leviathan: Market Transition and the Politics of Governance in China. Stanford University Press. 2004/2006.
- Beyond Beijing: Liberalization and the Regions in China. Routledge, 1997.
- Calamity and Reform in China: State, Rural Society and Institutional Change since the Great Leap Famine. Stanford University Press, 1996.
- The Global Recession and China's Political Economy (edited). Palgrave Macmillan, 2012.
- China's Reforms at Thirty: Challenges and Prospects (ed. with Zhao Litao). World Scientific, 2009.
- Discontented Miracle: Growth, Conflict and Institutional Adaptations in China(edited). World Scientific, 2007.
- Holding China Together: Diversity and National Integration in the Post-Deng Era, ed. with Barry Naughton. Cambridge University Press, 2004.
