= Retreat of the state, advance of the private sector =

- Chinese: 国退民进
- meaning: State-owned enterprises retreats, private firms advance

Retreat of the state, advance of the private sector (Chinese: 国退民进; pinyin: guó tuì mín jìn), or state retreats and people advance, is an economic term referring to the phenomenon of private companies moving forward as state-owned enterprises retreat from economic life. In the Chinese context, the notion specifically means the policy of privatization of state-owned enterprises and the issues it raises during the reform and opening-up process in China.

In 1998, the Chinese government comprehensively launched the policy of "guó tuì mín jìn", allowing state-owned capital to withdraw from competitive industries and private enterprises to enter. Since the reform and opening up, China has swung between state socialism and state capitalism, and into the 21st century, it was gradually replaced by "the state advances, the private sector retreats".

After 1978, the first landmark event of the phenomenon of "guó tuì mín jìn" in China was the "Tieben Incident" that occurred in 2004. From 2008 to 2009, it reached a climax. The merger and reorganization of coal mining enterprises in Shanxi and the merger of Rizhao Iron and Steel by Shandong Iron and Steel Group were the landmark events.

== See also ==
- The state advances as the private sector retreats
