= Taiwan Academy =

Non-profit public institutes

Taiwan Academy (Chinese: 臺灣書院; pinyin: Táiwān Shūyuàn) are non-profit public institutes with a stated aim of promoting Mandarin language, Traditional Chinese characters, and research on Taiwan-related topics. The Ministry of Culture of the Republic of China (ROC) established the Taiwan Academy in 2011.

== History ==
Although the ROC has operated Chinese schools and cultural centers in foreign countries for years, the Taiwan Academy represent more centralized control over cultural diplomacy with the Executive Yuan's Council for Cultural Affairs (CCA) joining the Overseas Community Affairs Council, which had traditionally concerned itself only with Overseas Chinese. As a candidate, President Ma Ying-jeou proposed the creation of Taiwan Academy during the 2008 Republic of China presidential election, along with a $150 million fund to create a Nobel Prize in Literature-like award for Chinese people. The Taipei Economic and Cultural Representative Office opened the first Academies in New York, Los Angeles, and Houston on 14 October 2011. Immediately, the name "Taiwan Academy" was criticized by legislators from the ruling Kuomintang party as "degrading" and "signifying self-localization", as opposed to a name like "Zhonghua Academy" (中華書院), which would emphasize a broader representation of Han Chinese culture. The ROC's Minister of Culture Lung Ying-tai said the Taiwan Academies will neither compete with nor cooperate with mainland China's Confucius Institutes for the time being. The CCA cited the Taiwan Academy as a way of exerting the government's soft power and to provide "insights into Chinese culture with Taiwanese features".

In addition to the three Taiwan Academies established in the United States, the Ministry of Culture has also set up Taiwan Academy contact points in 64 countries as of September 2013. The contact points represent long-term agreements with collaborating educational institutions to assist in the dissemination of information related to the Taiwan Academy and promote programs offered by the academy.

== Activities ==
Taiwan Academy have a budget of $21.1 million per year to fund scholarships for Sinology and Taiwan studies, and will also promote academic exchange with foreigners. Taiwan Academy are involved with screening movies from and distributing the Culture Ministry's "Taiwan Cinema Toolkit", which features subtitled films from Taiwan-origin directors like Ang Lee and Edward Yang. Plans for their digital library include a highlight on the island's "non-Chinese" culture.
