= Lionel M. Jensen =

American academic

Lionel M. Jensen is an American academic who is an associate professor of East Asian Languages and Cultures, concurrent associate professor of History, and a fellow at the Kellogg Institute for International Studies at the University of Notre Dame.

== Education ==
Jensen studied history at Williams College during the 1970s. In 2011, Jensen said that his interest in studying the history of China began at Williams, where he "became inspired by the courage, tenacity and willfulness of the Chinese people in waging a revolution against poverty, hunger, superlative disadvantage and international resistance to found a new independent socialist republic." Jensen earned his Ph.D. from the University of California, Berkeley in 1992.

== Career ==
Jensen has been cited as an expert on Chinese history, culture, and politics, as well as Chinese nationalism and religion in Asia. He is also a scholar and critic of Confucius Institutes.

Jensen has been public a critic of China's interpretation of the Hong Kong Basic Law. Jensen has also publicly criticized China's treatment of human rights lawyers, which he has described as "an extra-legal or illegal pattern of apprehending civil rights lawyers whose success in laboring in the courts against the government’s routine."

=== Confucianism ===
In his 1998 book, Manufacturing Confucianism: Chinese Traditions and Universal Civilization, Jensen argues that the modern conception of the person of Confucius was invented by the Jesuits.

== Selected publications ==
- Early China (1997)
- Manufacturing Confucianism: Chinese Traditions and Universal Civilization (1998)
- China Beyond the Headlines (2002)
- China Off Center: Mapping the Margins of the Middle Kingdom (2002)
- The Genesis of Kongzi in Ancient Narrative (2003)
- China’s Transformations: the Stories Beyond the Headlines (2007)
- China in and beyond the Headlines (2012)
