= In Praise of Hard Industries =

1999 book by Eamonn Fingleton

- Author: Eamonn Fingleton
- Publication date: 1999

In Praise of Hard Industries is a book about the economic impact of fewer manufacturing jobs in the United States written by Irish journalist and author Eamonn Fingleton. It was published in 1999, when the author resided in Tokyo. The book was reissued in a 2003 paperback edition under the title Unsustainable: How Economic Dogma Is Destroying American Prosperity.

The book argued that the shift in the American workforce from industry to knowledge workers was setting the country up for an economic collapse. It criticizes financial innovation as a ruse to sell complex financial instruments and urged for more advanced manufacturing in the United States. The book argued that industrial activities create jobs and exports, and that job salaries would be protected in environments using high-end equipment.

In its first chapter, the book enunciates the "Three Strikes Against the New Economy": a bad job mix, slow income growth, and a dearth of exports.

== Reception ==
The book elicited strong and mixed responses. Liberal economist James K. Galbraith said in The New York Times that Fingleton was "the sort of journalist economists despise," arguing that the book was "anecdotal, spurning statistics or other corroboration" and that it overstated the decline of American manufacturing.

In October 1999, business writer L. M. Sixel criticized Fingleton's argument as being "overblown" and "sophomoric" in the Houston Chronicle.

== Notes ==
- Fingleton, Eamonn. Unsustainable: How Economic Dogma Is Destroying American Prosperity. Buttonwood Press, 2003. ISBN 1-56025-514-5
