= Hanban =

PRC Ministry of Education body

Centre for Language Education and Cooperation
- 中外语言交流合作中心
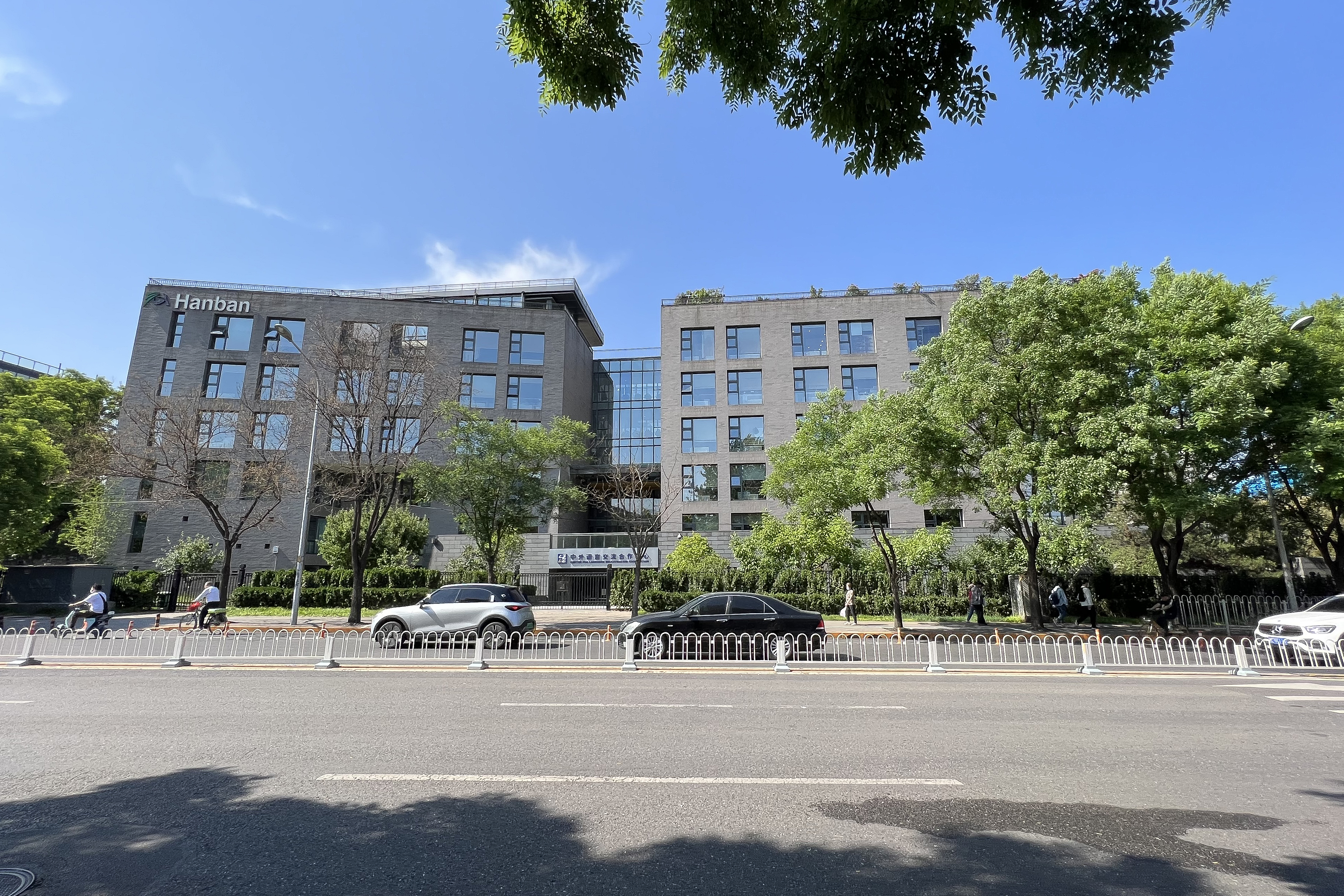
- Headquarters of the Center for Language Education and Cooperation, with Hanban markings
- Formation: 1987
- Type: Organization under the Ministry of Education
- Location: Beijing
- Parent organization: Ministry of Education of the People's Republic of China
- Website: www.chinese.cn

The Centre for Language Education and Cooperation (Chinese: 中外语言交流合作中心) is an organization under the Ministry of Education of the People's Republic of China tasked with "providing Chinese language and cultural teaching resources and services worldwide". It is commonly referred to as the Hanban (Chinese: 汉办; pinyin: Hàn bàn), the colloquial abbreviation for the Office of Han Language Council International (Chinese: 国家汉语国际推广领导小组办公室); it is also known as Confucius Institute Headquarters.

It was originally called the China National Office for Teaching Chinese as a Foreign Language, which was established in 1987, and acquired its current name in 2020. Hanban is most notable for the Confucius Institute program. It also sponsors Chinese Bridge, a competition in Chinese proficiency for non-native speakers. Organizationally, Hanban sits directly under the Ministry of Education. It has numerous subdivisions, including three separate Confucius Institute divisions in charge of Asian and African, American and Oceanian, and European regions. Hanban has been criticized for its Confucius Institute program and for the actions of former Director General Xu Lin.

== History ==
The China National Office for Teaching Chinese as a Foreign Language (NOCFL, Chinese: 国家对外汉语教学领导小组) was established in 1987 to "enhance the mutual understanding and friendship between the Chinese people and other peoples of the world, promote economic and trade cooperation as well as scientific, technological and cultural exchanges between them".

In 2004, Hanban and the U.S. College Board developed the "AP Chinese Language and Culture Course and Exam" program. As a result of this and other initiatives, approximately 160 U.S. Chinese language teachers have attended the AP Chinese Teacher Summer Institutes. Since 2006, Hanban has been sending volunteer teachers from China to the U.S., and 105 such teachers have taught Chinese in 30 U.S. states.

Following a widespread backlash, Hanban changed its name in July 2020 to the Centre for Language Education and Cooperation.

== Administration ==
According to its website, Hanban's goals include "making Chinese language and culture teaching resources and services available to the world", "meeting the demands of overseas Chinese learners", and "contributing to the formation of a world of cultural diversity and harmony". Hanban aims to cultivate knowledge and interest in the Chinese language and culture around the world, especially in people who are not native speakers of Chinese. Hanban has worked "closely with overseas organizations to develop Chinese language courses in their respective countries".

=== Functions ===
Hanban's primary functions include making "policies and development plans for promoting Chinese language internationally", supporting "Chinese language programs at educational institutions of various types and levels in other countries", and drafting "international Chinese teaching standards and develop and promote Chinese language teaching materials".

Hanban is most notable for the Confucius Institute program. Launched in 2004, the program consists of individual institutions, or Confucius Institutes, in regions around the world, including the U.S., South Korea, Germany, Sweden, and Africa. Hanban also sponsors Chinese Bridge, a competition in Chinese proficiency for non-native speakers.

=== Directors ===
As of July 2019, Hanban has five directors: Ma Jianfei, Zhao Guocheng, Jing Wei, Yu Yunfeng, and Yu Tianqi. Directors of individual Confucius Institutes have four-year tenures, including a one-year probation period.

=== Organizational structure ===
Organizationally, Hanban sits directly under the Ministry of Education. It has numerous subdivisions, including the following:

- Division of General Affairs
- Division of Human Resources
- Division of Discipline Inspection
- Division of Auditing
- Division of Finance
- Division of Assets Management
- Division of Development and Planning
- Division of Policy Studies
- Division of Asian and African Confucius Institutes
- Division of American and Oceanian Confucius Institutes
- Division of European Confucius Institutes
- Division of Teachers
- Division of Volunteer Affairs
- Division of Teaching and Resources
- Division of Chinese Testing and Scholarship
- Division of Cultural Affairs
- Division of Sinology and China Studies
- Division of International Exchanges
- Information Office (Editorial Office of Confucius Institute)
- Division of Logistics

== Criticisms and controversies ==
Academics and journalists have criticized Hanban, particularly the Confucius Institute program that has rapidly grown worldwide since 2004.

=== Confucius Institutes ===
While inspecting Hanban, Li Changchun, a member of the Politburo Standing Committee of the Chinese Communist Party, stated that: "the construction of Confucius Institutes is an important channel to glorify Chinese culture, to help Chinese culture spread to the world", which is "part of China's foreign propaganda strategy".

In January 2010, the Chinese Ministry of Finance announced that the winning bid to build and maintain the Confucius Institute website was awarded to Hanban-subsidiary company Wuzhou Hanfeng Web Technology Ltd. (Wuzhou Hanfeng Wangluo Keji 五洲汉风网络科技) for CN¥35.2 million (US$5.7 million). Wuzhou Hanfeng Web Technology Ltd. was registered to Wáng Yǒnglì (王永利), Deputy Director-General of Hanban and Deputy Chief Executive of Confucius Institute Headquarters. This connection led news media and social media commentators to criticize Hanban for corruption and a lack of transparency. In response, Hanban Director-General Xià Jiànhuī (夏建辉) said that "the website will eventually be made into a learning portal that will be promoted globally" and that "this is a comprehensive project", maintaining that Hanban did not break any rules by allowing their own subsidiary company to win the contract.

According to The Globe and Mail, McMaster University ended its five-year relationship with Hanban after former McMaster Confucius Institute teacher Sonia Zhao quit her job and subsequently complained to the Human Rights Tribunal of Ontario that the university was "giving legitimization to discrimination". Under her job contract, Zhao was forced to hide her belief in Falun Gong, a spiritual movement that the Chinese government deems "dangerous". Zhao stated that she was "trained in Beijing to dodge sensitive topics in class".

In December 2013, the Canadian Association of University Teachers (CAUT) passed a resolution, "That all universities and colleges in Canada which currently host Confucius Institutes on their campuses cease doing so, and universities and colleges currently contemplating such arrangements pursue them no further." CAUT executive director James Turk described Confucius Institutes as "essentially political arms of the Chinese government". Turk stated that the ten Canadian universities that hosted Confucius Institutes were compromising their integrity by allowing Hanban to have a voice in academic matters such as curriculum and topics of class discussion, which constitutes a "fundamental violation of academic freedom". In June 2014, the American Association of University Professors (AAUP) called on the almost 100 American universities that hosted Confucius Institutes to renegotiate their contracts with Hanban. The AAUP's Report on Academic Freedom stated that "Confucius Institutes function as an arm of the Chinese state and are allowed to ignore academic freedom."

A 21 June 2014 editorial in The Washington Post listed concerns regarding Confucius Institutes, including the AAUP advising universities to cut Hanban ties, alleged violations of freedom of speech and human rights, and the secrecy of undisclosed contracts between schools and Hanban. It concluded that "academic freedom cannot have a price tag" and recommended that if universities will not publish their Confucius Institute agreements, the programs should end. On 24 June, the official Chinese news agency Xinhua responded, saying that the claims made by the AAUP and others—that Confucius Institutes "function as an arm of the Chinese state and are pushing political agendas"—actually "expose not so much communist propaganda as their own intolerance of exotic cultures and biased preconceived notions to smear and isolate the CPC".

=== Xu Lin incidents ===
Xu Lin, the Director-General of Hanban and Chief Executive of the Confucius Institute Headquarters, was involved in two international incidents in 2014. In July, she ordered her staff to remove pages referring to Taiwanese academic institutions from the published program for the European Association for Chinese Studies conference in Portugal, claiming the materials were "contrary to Chinese regulations", which the Wall Street Journal described as the "bullying approach to academic freedom". In September, the University of Chicago closed its Confucius Institute, citing incompatibility with Xu's comments regarding the university in a Jiefang Daily article. The Business Spectator commented that the "Xu's hardline behavior highlights one of the biggest problems for Beijing's charm offensive" and that "It still relies on officials like Xu, who still think and act like party ideologues who like to assert their authority and bully people into submission."

==== Braga incident ====
On 22 July 2014, the evening before the start of the European Association of Chinese Studies (EACS) conference in Braga, Portugal, Xu Lin removed four pages from the conference program and one page from the abstracts, which referred to Taiwan's Chiang Ching-kuo Foundation for International Scholarly Exchange, a major sponsor of the conference for the past 20 years. The EACS subsequently reprinted the deleted materials to distribute to the conference members. EACS president Roger Greatrex subsequently issued a report on the page deletions and an official letter of protest that concluded, "Such interference in the internal organization of the international conference of an independent and democratically organized non-profitable academic organization is totally unacceptable."

The Confucius China Studies Program (CCSP), which is administered by the Confucius Institute, was another major sponsor of the conference, and Sun Lam, director of the University of Minho Confucius Institute was a co-organizer of the conference. The CCSP international conference funding application stated, "The conference is regulated by the laws and decrees of both China and the host country, and will not carry out any activities which are deemed to be adverse to the social order." Dr. Lam submitted a draft copy of the program to the CCSP, who subsequently approved the materials.

Conference registration began on 22 July 2014, and about 100 participants received complete copies of the abstracts and program, which comprised 89 pages plus a cover and front pages. However, after Xu Lin arrived that evening, she proclaimed that mention of the CCSP sponsorship be removed from the Conference Abstracts and ordered her entourage from the Confucius Institute Headquarters to remove all conference materials and take them to the apartment of a local Confucius Institute employee. The remaining 300 participants who arrived for conference registration on 23 July did not receive the printed abstracts or programs but only a brief summarized schedule. After last-minute negotiations between Xu Lin and conference organizers to ensure conference members received the program, a compromise was made to allow the removal of one abstract page that mentioned the CCSP support of the conference.

On the morning of 24 July, the remaining 300 conference participants received their materials, which were now missing four printed pages: the frontispiece mentioning the CCSP sponsorship in the conference abstract and three pages from the conference program. These expurgated pages contained information regarding the book exhibition and library donation organized by the Taiwan National Central Library, and the Chiang Ching-kuo Foundation for International Scholarly Exchange.

The director of the National Central Library stated that EACS officials and members had spoken out against Xu during the opening ceremony. Marshall Sahlins explained that the EACS censorship highlighted Hanban's seriousness in enforcing its contractual provisions "the way they do in China which is not so much by going to court [...] but simply by fiat". The Christian Science Monitor said that the censorship has made more American, European, and Australian academics grow uneasy with Confucius Institutes. It reported that when Ms. Xu met privately with foreign scholars in Shanghai, who asked specifically about the missing pages, "she denied ordering them censored."

In December 2014, the BBC interviewed Xu Lin in Beijing. When the interviewer brought up the Braga incident, Xu Lin objected and later asked for large portions of the interview to be deleted. One of the claims she made in the interview is that Taiwan belongs to China, and therefore outsiders have no business interfering. The BBC did not agree to the censorship demand. "Xu Lin not only refused to answer difficult questions, she also politicised the Confucius Institutes and reinforced the idea that they are led by dogmatists," commented Gary Rawnsley, professor of Public Diplomacy at Aberystwyth University, Wales. The Wall Street Journal reported on Xu's BBC interview, noting that "Critics have argued that China's Confucius Institutes pose a threat to academic freedom in the United States, Canada, Europe and beyond. Now the Beijing official in charge of them has confirmed it."

==== University of Chicago Confucius Institute closure ====
On 25 September 2014, the University of Chicago stated that it had suspended negotiations to renew its Confucius Institute contract because "recently published comments about UChicago in an article about the director-general of Hanban are incompatible with a continued equal partnership." This indirectly referred to an interview Xu had with Jiefang Daily, in which she claimed to have intimidated the university's president "with a single sentence", after 100 professors signed a petition to ban the Confucius Institute. Xu Lin wrote a letter to the university's president and called the university representative in Beijing "with only one line: 'If your school decides to withdraw, I will agree to it.' Her attitude made the other side anxious. The school quickly responded that it will continue to properly manage the Confucius Institute."

Other media reports said Xu's comments "brought panic" to the university, which was convinced by this "demeaning depiction" that an equal partnership was impossible; "could be construed as a boastful challenge"; "implied the school had kowtowed to the Chinese government"; or caused university administrators to become "anxious" at the thought of shutting down the Confucius Institute.

== See also ==
- Confucius Institute
- Chinese language
- Ministry of Education (China)
