= The state advances as the private sector retreats =

Chinese catchphrase

Guó jìn mín tuì (国进民退) is an alleged phenomenon in the Chinese economy, meaning "the state advances as the private sector retreats". It is frequently mentioned in the Chinese economic growth cycle that started in 2002.

Despite being less profitable - the average return on equity is 4% - state-owned enterprises have easier access to funding than purely private enterprises. The government has encouraged state-owned enterprises to consolidate, favored them in regulation, and awarded them contracts and subsidies; this crowds out other competitors, both domestic and foreign, undermining the economy.

This contrasts with an earlier phase of reform and opening up, where the private sector was seen as flourishing and generating growth; in the late 1990s, Zhu Rongji weeded out some of the weaker state-owned enterprises.

However, in some contexts, "guo jin min tui" has been contrasted with "guo jin min ye jin", meaning "the state and the market develop together".

Six years ago, the central government invited private investors to enter the business. By 2006, eight private carriers had sprung up to challenge the three state-controlled majors, Air China, China Southern and China Eastern. The state airlines immediately began a price war. The state-owned monopoly that provided jet fuel refused to service private carriers on the same generous terms given the big three. China’s only computerized reservation system – currently one-third owned by the three state airlines – refused to book flights for private competitors. And when mismanagement and the 2008 economic crisis drove the three majors into financial straits, the central government bought stock to bail them out.

== Reforms ==
In 2008–2012, the government's stimulus package, a response to the 2008 financial crisis, pushed up inflation and increased liquidity; this exacerbated the problem of guo jin min tui. As part of the stimulus, the government continued to prop up individual SOEs whilst letting private enterprises fall by the wayside. There have been calls for this system to be reformed, increasing competition and hence productivity.

== See also ==
- Retreat of the state, advance of the private sector
