= Eamonn Fingleton =

Irish financial journalist and author

- Born: Eamonn Fingleton; 19 August 1948 (age 76); Ireland
- Occupation: Journalist
- Spouse: Mary McCutchan (1970–1974) Yasuko Amako (1988–2012)
- Website: fingleton.net

Eamonn Fingleton (born 19 August 1948) is an Irish financial journalist and author.

He is a critic of financialisation, arguing that there is no substitute for advanced manufacturing industries (highly capital-intensive, know-how-intensive industries typically making capital equipment, new materials, and leading edge components) as the main pillar of an advanced economy.

His second US-published book, In Praise of Hard Industries: Why Manufacturing, Not the Information Economy, Is the Key to Future Prosperity, published in 1999, took a contrarian stance on the New Economy.

== Books ==
- In the Jaws of the Dragon: America's Fate in the Coming Era of Chinese Hegemony (2008). St. Martin's Press/Thomas Dunne Books. ISBN 0-312-36232-3
- In Praise of Hard Industries: Why Manufacturing, Not the Information Economy, Is the Key to Future Prosperity (1999). Houghton Mifflin. ISBN 0-395-89968-0
- Blindside: Why Japan Is Still on Track to Overtake the US By the Year 2000 (1995). Houghton Mifflin. ISBN 0-395-63316-8
