= Confucius Institute =

Chinese international educational partnership program

- Founded: 2004; 22 years ago
- Type: Cultural promotion organization
- Purpose: Chinese culture, Chinese language
- Location: 15 Xueyuan Road, Haidian District, Beijing
- Region served: Worldwide
- Method: Education and advocacy
- Owner: Chinese International Education Foundation (2020–present); Hanban (before 2020)
- Website: ci.cn/en/

Confucius Institute
- Simplified Chinese: 孔子学院
- Traditional Chinese: 孔子學院
Transcriptions
Standard Mandarin
- Hanyu Pinyin: Kǒngzǐ Xuéyuàn
Yue: Cantonese
- Jyutping: hung2 zi2 hok6 jyun2

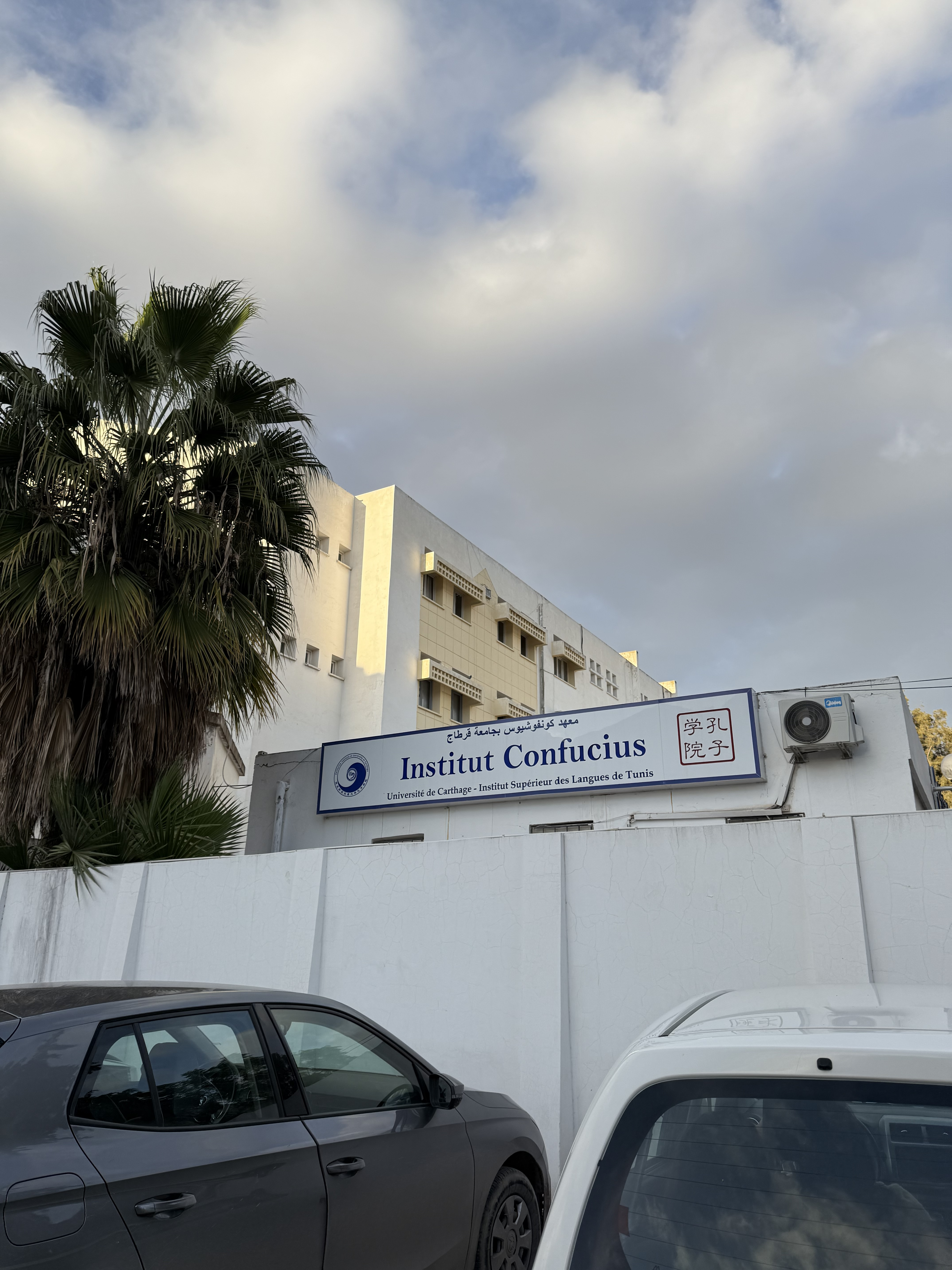
Confucius Institute at Carthage University in Tunis, Tunisia

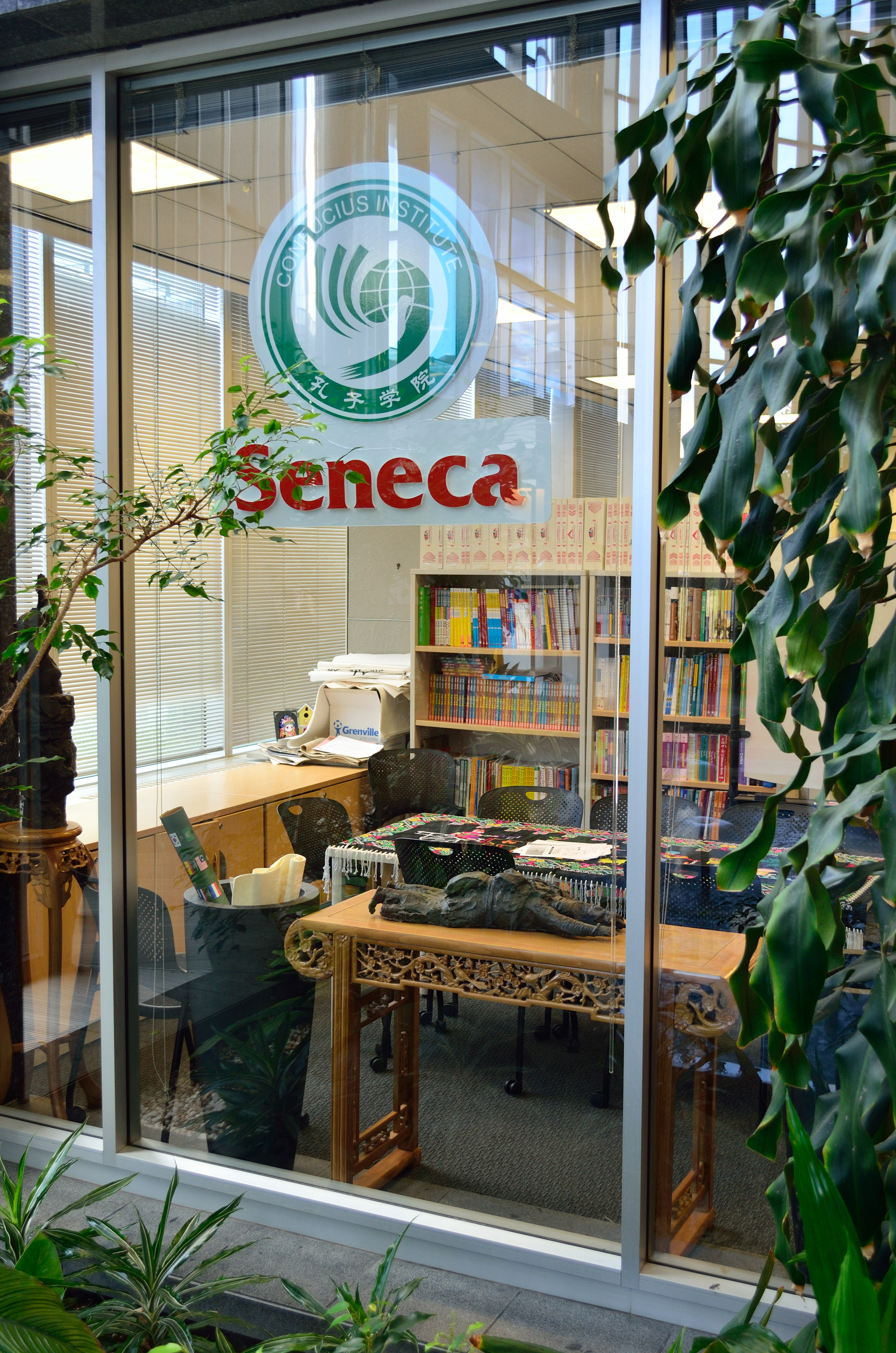
A Confucius Institute at Seneca College in Toronto, Canada

Confucius Institutes (CI; Chinese: 孔子学院; pinyin: Kǒngzǐ Xuéyuàn) are public educational and cultural promotion programs of China. The stated aim of the program is to promote Chinese language and culture, support local Chinese teaching internationally, and facilitate cultural exchanges.

The program is funded and arranged by the Chinese International Education Foundation (CIEF), a government-organized non-governmental organization (GONGO) under the Ministry of Education of the People's Republic of China. The Confucius Institute program was formerly under Hanban, another organization under the Ministry of Education.

The Confucius Institute program began in 2004 overseen by individual universities. In 2020, the Chinese International Education Foundation was registered and granted exclusive use of Confucius Institute's trademark, and began to operate Confucius Institutes under a brand licensing model. The institutes operate in co-operation with local affiliate colleges and universities around the world, and financing is shared between Hanban and the host institutions. The related Confucius Classroom program partners with local secondary schools or school districts to provide teachers and instructional materials.

Officials from China have compared Confucius Institutes to language and culture promotion organizations such as Britain's British Council, France's Alliance Française, and Spain's Instituto Cervantes. Research from the Freeman Spogli Institute and Stanford Institute for Economic Policy Research suggested that Confucius Institute employees have minimal training in politics, face little day-to-day monitoring while teaching abroad and are not screened for political beliefs. They do, however, tend to disseminate political perspectives in keeping with the official political views of the Chinese Communist Party (CCP) and often prefer not to talk about Chinese political issues at all.

Confucius Institutes have been accused of being used as a form of "soft power" by the Chinese government, which spends approximately $10 billion a year on CIs and related programs to exercise these initiatives. CCP general secretary Xi Jinping in 2013 stated that the intentions are to "give a good Chinese narrative". There have been concerns about potential censorship regarding certain content, including discussions on individual freedoms and democracy, the 1989 Tiananmen Square protests and massacre, Taiwan independence, human rights in Tibet, Falun Gong, and persecution of Uyghurs in China. Controversies involving CIs in the United States have led to scrutiny from public officials and legislative action, with Congress restricting federal funding to schools with institutes in 2018 and nearly all of the institutes since closing.

== History ==
The first Confucius Institute opened in 2004 in Seoul, South Korea, after establishing a pilot institute in Tashkent, Uzbekistan in June 2004. The CI in South Korea is no longer active. The second Confucius Institute was opened on the campus of the University of Maryland, College Park, also in November 2004. In 2006, the goal of 1,000 Confucius Institutes by 2020 was being discussed.

Hundreds more have opened since in dozens of countries around the world. All countries in the Cooperation between China and Central and Eastern European (China-CEE) host at least one Confucius Institute, and some (Serbia, Bosnia and Herzegovina, Hungary, and Romania) host multiple of them. In 2001, the first Confucius Institute in Africa opened as a collaboration between University of Nairobi in Kenya and Tianjin Normal University in China.

In April 2007, the first research-based Confucius Institute opened in Waseda University in Japan. In partnership with Peking University, the program promotes research activities of graduate students studying Chinese. In 2007, China's Ministry of Education estimated that 100 million people overseas would be learning Chinese by 2010.

In 2010, the highest concentration of institutes was in the United States, Japan, and South Korea.

From 2006 to 2019, the Chinese government spent more than $150 million on institutes in the U.S. The number of institutes in the U.S. peaked in 2018, at around 100, with the total around the world being about 550. As of 2019, there were 530 Confucius Institutes in dozens of countries on six continents.

In 2022, the Confucius Institute at the University of Karachi was attacked in a suicide bombing.

At the end of 2023, there were 498 Confucius Institutes and 773 Confucius Classrooms established over 160 countries and regions.

== Name ==
The Confucius Institute is named after the noted Chinese philosopher Confucius (551–479 BC). Throughout the 20th century, CCP leaders criticized and denounced Confucius as the personification of China's "feudal" traditions, with anti-Confucianism ranging from the 1912 New Culture Movement to the 1973 Criticize Lin, Criticize Confucius campaign during the Cultural Revolution. However, in recent decades, interest in pre-modern Chinese culture has grown in the country, and Confucius in particular has seen a resurgence in popularity. Outside of China, Confucius is a generally recognizable symbol of Chinese culture, removed from the negative associations of other prominent Chinese figures such as chairman Mao Zedong.

"Confucius Institute" is a trademarked brand name, which according to a spokesman for the organisation, "Those who enjoy more brand names will enjoy higher popularity, reputation, more social influence, and will therefore be able to generate more support from local communities." A 2011 crackdown protected "Confucius Institute" from preregistration infringement in Costa Rica.

A China Post article reported in 2014 that "Certainly, China would have made little headway if it had named these Mao Institutes, or even Deng Xiaoping Institutes. But by borrowing the name Confucius, it created a brand that was instantly recognized as a symbol of Chinese culture, radically different from the image of the Communist Party."

== Purpose ==
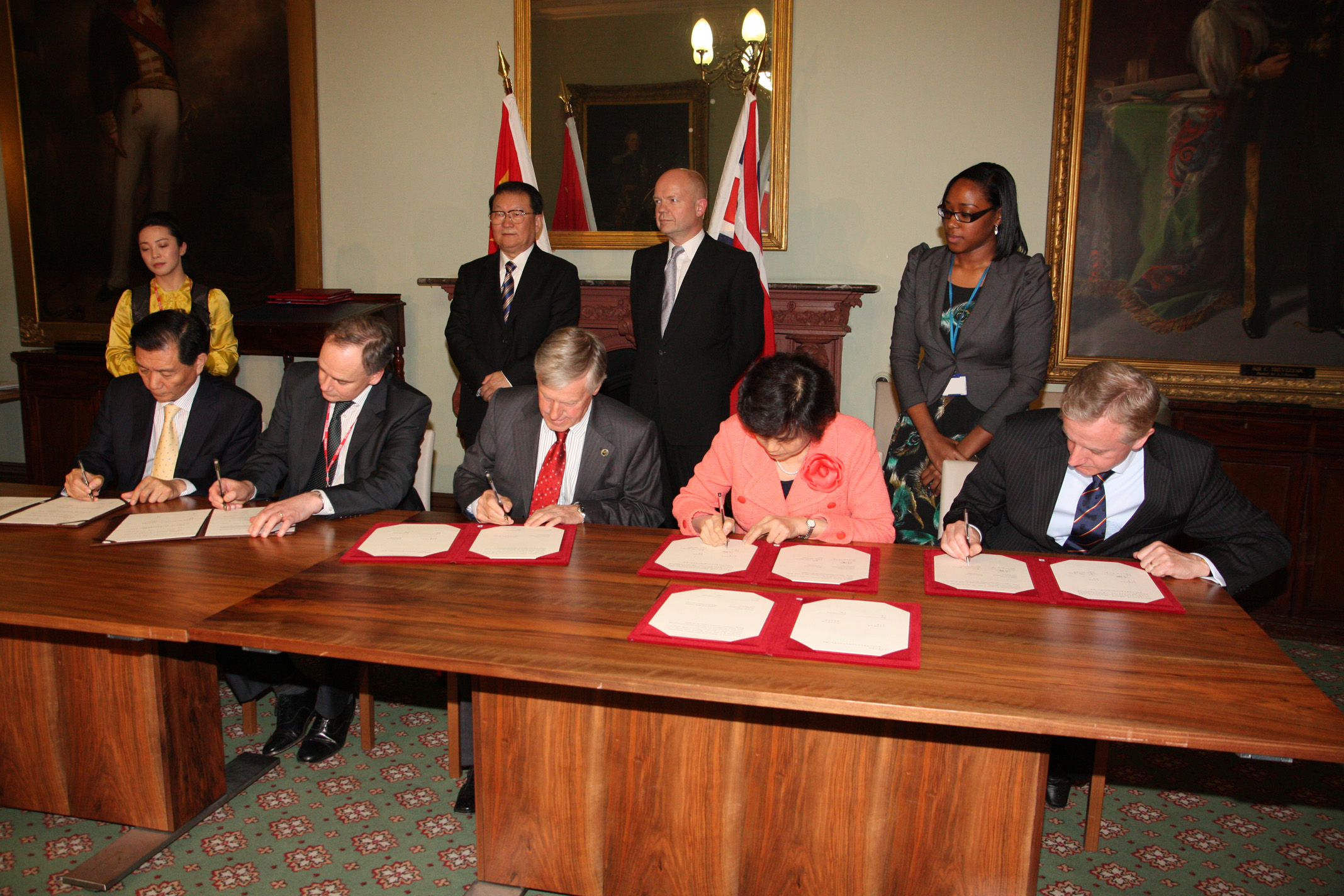
British Foreign Secretary William Hague and Li Changchun at a signing ceremony in London, 17 April 2012, for the agreement between Confucius Institute of China and Bangor University on the establishment of Confucius Institute at Bangor University, United Kingdom. The agreement was signed by John Hughes, vice-chancellor of Bangor University, and Xu Lin, director of the Confucius Institute.

The stated purpose of Confucius Institutes (CIs) is to promote and teach Chinese culture and language around the world. The director of the CI program, Xu Lin, stated that CIs were started to cater to the sudden uptick in interest of the Chinese language around the world. They also provide Chinese language teaching staff from mainland China. As of 2011, there were 200 such teachers working in the United States. In the Middle East 14 institute, and the main purpose for the local population to participate in the institute activities are learning Chinese to find a job in the local market or to find a job in the growing Chinese market.

Confucius Institutes are also intended by China as cultural diplomacy to use language and culture to promote China's image overseas and create a positive international environment for China. People's Daily has described Confucius Institutes as a form of public diplomacy.

== Organization ==
Confucius Institutes were previously under Hanban, a non-profit government organization affiliated with the Ministry of Education and operated by a committee of party-state officials. The Confucius Institute headquarters in Beijing establishes the guidelines which the separate Confucius Institutes worldwide follows. The headquarters is governed by a council with fifteen members, ten of whom are directors of overseas institutes. The institutes themselves are individually managed under the leadership of their own board of directors, which should include members of the host institution. The current chair of the Confucius Institute Headquarters council is Liu Yandong, a Chinese vice premier and member of the Politburo of the Chinese Communist Party who formerly headed the United Front Work Department. Other leaders of the council are similarly drawn from the CCP and central government agencies, such as the Ministry of Finance, Ministry of Education, and the State Council Information Office (also known as the Office of Overseas Propaganda). The council sets the agenda for the Confucius Institutes and makes changes to the bylaws while other tasks and ongoing management of the Confucius Institute Headquarters are handled by the professional executive leadership headed by the director-general.

The Chinese Government shares the burden of funding Confucius Institutes with host universities, and takes a hands-off approach to management. The institutes function independently within the guidelines established by Hanban and the Confucius Institute Headquarters. Each institute is responsible for drawing up and managing their own budget, which is subject to approval by the headquarters. The Confucius Institute Headquarters provides various restrictions on how their funds may be used, including earmarking funds for specific purposes. Institutes in the United States were generally provided with $100,000 annually from Hanban, with the local university required to match funding.

In addition to their local-partner university, Confucius Institutes operate in co-operation with a Chinese partner university. The Chinese partner university supplies teaching materials, a co-director/dean, and instructors. Many institutes are governed by a board which is composed of several members from the Chinese partner school, with the remaining members affiliated with the local-partner university. Most of the Confucius Institutes in Central Asian countries are partnered with universities in Xinjiang. At most institutes, the director is appointed by the local partner university.

In July 2020, Hanban announced its renaming to Center for Language Education and Cooperation, stating that The Confucius Institute was fully handed over to Chinese International Education Foundation, a self-described "non-governmental private organization".

== Curriculum ==
The curriculum of Confucius Institutes is based on the institute's role as a language center. All Confucius Institutes teach Chinese language and culture, with their offerings varying across branches. For instance, one branch might focus on business Chinese while another emphasizes everyday Chinese language skills. Courses on culture may also range from cooking to Tai Chi to calligraphy.

In addition to courses (which are sometimes taught for-credit and sometimes not-for-credit), Confucius Institutes typically host extracurricular activities included Chinese New Year Festivals, Mid-Autumn Festivals, tea ceremonies, art exhibitions, musical performances, film screenings, guest lectures, and conferences.

School officials, researchers, and other people interviewed by the U.S. Government Accountability Office (GAO) offered mixed experiences in their autonomy over the curriculum. According to the GAO report, "officials from multiple case study schools noted that U.S. school faculty members make all decisions regarding conference themes, guest speakers, and topics for events at their institute." Further, some schools were able to host conferences and programs that are critical of the CCP. At other schools, officials have raised concerns that the Confucius Institute espouses a sanitized view of Chinese society that avoids contentious topics like human rights abuses and Tibet, and they also express concerns regarding whether the Hanban would sponsor events that discuss views contrary to those of the CCP. At one school, the Confucius Institute Chinese director allegedly removed literature material about Taiwan. At another school, a Hanban representative attempted to exclude information on Taiwan from the program provided to attendees at a conference.

In an analysis of China-Ethiopia relations published in 2026, academic Maria Repnikova writes that Confucius Institute language learning services are offered free or low-cost to Ethiopians and that these services can provide tangible benefits, like scholarship opportunities or prospects of employment at Chinese companies.

== Criticism and controversies ==
In the short time-frame of their rapid expansion, the institutes have been the subject of much controversy. Criticisms of the institutes have included administrative concerns about finance, academic viability, legal issues, and relations with the Chinese partner university, as well as broader concerns about improper influence over teaching and research, industrial and military espionage, surveillance of Chinese abroad, and undermining Taiwanese influence. There has also been organized opposition to the establishment of a Confucius Institute at University of Melbourne, University of Manitoba, Stockholm University, University of Chicago and many others. More significantly, some universities that hosted Confucius Institutes decided to terminate their contracts. These include Japan's Osaka Sangyo University in 2010; Canada's McMaster University and Université de Sherbrooke, and France's University of Lyon in 2013; the University of Chicago, Pennsylvania State University, and the Toronto District School Board in 2014, the German Stuttgart Media University and University of Hohenheim in 2015, and Vrije Universiteit Brussel and University of Kansas in 2019.

Controversy regarding Confucius Institutes in the US, Australian, and Canadian press includes criticism that unlike other governments' language and culture promotion organizations, the Confucius Institutes operate within established universities, colleges, and secondary schools around the world, providing funding, teachers and educational materials. This has raised concerns over their influence on academic freedom, the possibility of industrial espionage, and concerns that the institutes present a selective and politicized view of China as a means of advancing the country's soft power internationally.

Underlying such opposition is concern by professors and students that a Confucius Institute would interfere with academic freedom and be able to pressure the university to censor speech on topics the CCP objects to. An article in The Chronicle of Higher Education asserts that there is little evidence of meddling from China, although the same article did go on to say the institutes were "distinct in the degree to which they were financed and managed by a foreign government". After interviewing China scholars, journalists and CI directors, a writer for The Diplomat, a publication covering politics, society, and culture in the Indo-Pacific region, also found little support for the concern that CIs would serve as propaganda vehicles, though some of her sources did note that they would face constraints in their curriculum on matters such as Tibet and human rights. An article in The New York Times quotes Arthur Waldron, a professor of international relations at the University of Pennsylvania, saying that the key issue is academic independence. "Once you have a Confucius Institute on campus, you have a second source of opinions and authority that is ultimately answerable to the Chinese Communist Party and which is not subject to scholarly review."

In October 2013, University of Chicago professor Marshall Sahlins published an extensive investigative article criticizing the Confucius Institutes and the universities hosting them. Later, more than 100 faculty members signed a protest against the Confucius Institute at the University of Chicago. In September 2014, the University of Chicago suspended its negotiation for renewal of the agreement with Hanban. Two months later, the Canadian Association of University Teachers urged Canadian universities and colleges to end ties with the Confucius Institute.

In June 2014, the American Association of University Professors issued a statement urging American universities to cease their collaboration with the Confucius Institute unless the universities can have unilateral control of the academia affairs, that the teachers in Confucius Institutes can have the same academic freedom enjoyed by other university faculty members, and that the agreements between universities and Confucius Institutes are available to the community. The AAUP statement was widely noticed by U.S. media and prompted extensive further debate in the U.S.

Two months later, in August 2014, Xu Lin, Director-General of the Hanban and Chief Executive of the CIs worldwide, became embroiled in an incident in Braga, Portugal, when Xu ordered her staff to rip pages referring to Taiwanese academic institutions from the published program for the European Association for Chinese Studies conference in Braga, claiming the materials were "contrary to Chinese regulations". When Roger Greatrex, president of the EACS, learned of this censorship, he ordered that 500 copies of the original program immediately be printed and distributed to participants. He later wrote, "The seizure of the materials in such an unauthorized manner, after the conference had already begun, was extremely injudicious, and has promoted a negative view of the Confucius Institute Headquarters". The EACS letter of protest said this had been "the first occasion in the history of the EACS that its conference materials have been censored." It concluded, "Such interference in the internal organization of the international conference of an independent and democratically organized non-profitable academic organization is totally unacceptable." The Wall Street Journal described Xu's attempted censorship as the "bullying approach to academic freedom".

In September 2014, the University of Chicago closed their CI after pressure from faculty members, blaming Xu's comments that her threatening letter and phone call forced the university to continue hosting the institute. The Business Spectator concludes that the Xu Lin's hardline behavior highlights one of the biggest problems for Beijing's charm offensive. "It still relies on officials like Xu, who still think and act like party ideologues who like to assert their authority and bully people into submission." Less than a week later, Pennsylvania State University also cut ties with the Confucius Institute after coming to the conclusion that "its objectives were not in line with the Institute's".

In December 2014, Stockholm University, the first university in Europe to host a Confucius Institute, announced it was terminating the program. Press coverage of the Braga incident in the Swedish press was said to have influenced the decision. "Generally it is questionable to have, within the framework of the university, institutes that are financed by another country", said the university's chancellor.

In the same month, the United States House Foreign Affairs Subcommittee on Africa, Global Health, Global Human Rights and International Organizations held a hearing entitled "Is Academic Freedom Threatened by China's Influence on U.S. Universities?". Chairman Chris Smith said, "U.S. colleges and universities should not be outsourcing academic control, faculty and student oversight or curriculum to a foreign government", and called for a GAO study into agreements between American universities and China. On 5 December 2014, PRC Ministry of Foreign Affairs spokeswoman Hua Chunying denied the House testimony and said "We have assisted with supplying teachers and textbooks at the request of the U.S. side but have never interfered with academic freedom."

In 2018, U.S. Congress members from Texas wrote a letter to four universities in that state urging them to close their Confucius Institutes. Texas A&M did so shortly after receiving the letter. Throughout 2018 and 2019, all of the institutes in Florida were closed: the University of West Florida, the University of North Florida, the University of South Florida, and Miami Dade College.

A U.S. law passed in 2019 that prohibits universities hosting Confucius Institutes from receiving funding for Chinese language studies from the Department of Defense led to more closures of Confucius Institutes. Unable to obtain a waiver from the Department of Defense, Indiana University, the University of Minnesota, the University of Rhode Island, San Francisco State University, the University of Oregon, Western Kentucky University, Arizona State University, the University of Hawaii at Manoa, and San Diego State University closed their programs in 2019. In 2020, the University of Maryland also announced the closure of its Confucius Institute, the oldest one in the U.S.

On 19 February 2019, Leiden University in the Netherlands promised to end its agreement with Confucius Institute in August 2019. On 30 June 2021, Baruch College, City University of New York, ended its agreement with the Confucius Institute.

In 2020, Sweden ended agreements with all Confucius Institutes in the country. Management consultant Ross Feingold said the closure of the Confucius Institutes was the result of Sweden taking a much tougher view of China, as a result of Swedish national Gui Minhai being imprisoned for 10 years, and also comments by China's ambassador to Sweden, Gui Congyou, who threatened Sweden during an interview with broadcaster Swedish PEN in November 2019 saying that "We treat our friends with fine wine, but for our enemies we got shotguns", over the decision to award Gui Minhai with the Tucholsky Prize, the ambassador later clarified saying that China would impose trade restrictions on Sweden for this award. The embassy has systematically worked to influence the reporting on China by Swedish journalists.

On 13 May 2020, the College Democrats of America and the College Republicans National Committee released a joint-letter calling for "the immediate and permanent closure of all Confucius Institutes in the United States" based on the Human Rights Watch 12 Point Code of Conduct for academic freedom.

On 13 August 2020, U.S. Department of State designated the Confucius Institute U.S. Center as a foreign mission of the PRC. On 8 March 2021, the U.S. Senate passed a bill that would restrict colleges hosting Confucius Institutes from receiving some federal funding.

According to the Hessische/Niedersächsische Allgemeine report on 3 July 2021, the Göttingen Young Union (Junge Union) City Association is striving for the University of Hannover and the University of Göttingen to terminate their cooperation with the Confucius Institute. The Youth League promoted a motion on the grounds that the Confucius Institute is under the control of the CCP and "is aimed at strengthening the propaganda of Beijing's totalitarian ideology and exerting harmful influence on German universities". Yuhan Huang from Kunming, Yunnan Province of China wrote the motion proposal. He came to Germany in 2018 and is a member of the Christian Democratic Union of Germany (CDU), a main German political party, and a member of the Young Union youth organization. He introduced the situation of the Confucius Institute to the members of the organization, and organized related activities in Germany to request the termination of the cooperation between the Confucius Institute and German universities.

On 4 August 2021, the Human Rights Foundation published a report stating that Confucius Institutes "cultivated a climate of intimidation and surveillance within American classrooms" and "Both information censorship and self-censorship are especially prevalent, as educators, researchers, administrators, and students alike are steered away from learning and critically thinking about topics that may be deemed sensitive to the Chinese government such as democracy, 'the three T's', Hong Kong, the Uyghur genocide, and the CCP's other prevailing human rights infringements."

The United States National Defense Authorization Act for Fiscal Year 2021 withheld federal research funds from colleges and universities that had Confucius Institutes.

The Royal Melbourne Institute of Technology (RMIT) University shut down its Chinese medicine Confucius Institute in 2021.

As of 2022, all of the Confucius Institutes located on SUNY campuses were closed because federal research funding was jeopardized.

The Helsinki University ended the contract with the Confucius Institute in June 2022 after 15 years of operation.

According to a June 2022 report by the National Association of Scholars, out of the 118 Confucius Institutes once in the United States, 104 were either shut down or were in the process of closing. However, dozens of closed Confucius Institutes have resurfaced in other forms, with universities adopting similar programs, maintaining close relationships with the defunct Confucius Institutes, transferring Confucius Institutes to new hosts or starting a new Chinese partnership program.

In 2024, Taiwan's Mainland Affairs Council banned its citizens from working at Confucius Institutes due to national security concerns.

Confucius institutes have not been subject to such pushback in southeast Asia. In that region, Thailand in particular has been a major promoter of Chinese language education. With 16 Confucius Institutes as of 2024, Thailand hosts the most Confucius Institutes of any country in Asia.

In 2024, the Confucius Institutes at the University of Melbourne and the University of Queensland did not receive a contract renewal and was closed. In 2025, only 7 of the original 13 Confucius Institutes remained open in Australia.

In August 2025, there were 20 Confucius Institutes operating in England that faced pressure from the new free speech ruling imposed by the Office for Students which requires universities to amend or terminate arrangements if a foreign-funded institute influenced them.

In October 2026, the US Department of Defense declared the Confucius Institute a threat to US national security.

=== Political goals ===
While Chinese authorities have been cautious not to have CIs act as direct promoters of the party's political viewpoints, a few critics suggest that the Confucius Institutes function in this way. Officials say that one important goal of the institutes is to influence other countries' understanding of China. Peng Ming-min, a Taiwan independence activist and politician, claims that colleges and universities where a Confucius Institute is established have to sign a contract in which they declare their support for Beijing's "One China" policy. As a result, both Taiwan and Tibet become taboos at the institutes.

The CI's soft power goals are seen as an attempt by the PRC to modernize away from Soviet-influenced propaganda of the Maoist era. Other initiatives include Chinese contemporary art exhibitions, television programs, concerts by popular singers, translations of Chinese literature, and the expansion of state-run news channels such as Xinhua News Agency and China Central Television.

Academic and economist Jun Xiang was postulating causal mechanisms within individual cases for a relatively large number of cases in a large-N analysis to examine the Confucius Institute and demonstrate that it is designed to promote China's educational, economic, and political interests altogether.

=== Hiring policy ===
The Hanban website stated that Chinese language instructors should be "aged between 22 to 60, physical and mental healthy, no record of participation in Falun Gong and other illegal organizations, and no criminal record."

Human rights lawyer Clive Ansley has argued that the part of the hiring policy that discriminates against Falun Gong believers is in contravention of anti-discrimination laws and human rights codes. Marci Hamilton, Paul R. Verkuil Chair in Public Law at Yeshiva University, called this policy "unethical and illegal in the free world".

In 2013, McMaster University in Canada closed its Confucius Institute due to hiring issues over Falun Gong. Sonia Zhang, a former Confucius Institute teacher at McMaster University who quit after one year and since become a whistleblower, said she "had to sign a contract that excluded Falun Gong practitioners and was trained to give Beijing's line if asked by students about Tibet and other sensitive topics".

== See also ==
- United front (China)
- Chinese Bridge
- Istituto Italiano di Cultura
- Dante Alighieri Society
- Goethe-Institut
- British Council
- Hillel International
- Instituto Camões
- Instituto Cervantes
- Institut Français
- Taiwan Center for Mandarin Learning
- China's "soft power initiative"
- Propaganda in the People's Republic of China
- Panda diplomacy
