= Business Spectator =

Australian business news website

- Format: Online
- Owner: News Corp Australia
- Publisher: Australian Independent Business Media
- Editor: Alan Kohler
- Founded: 30 October 2007
- Headquarters: Melbourne, Australia
- Website: www.theaustralian.com.au/business

Business Spectator is an Australian business news website led by Alan Kohler as chairman and editor-in-chief. It is published by Australian Independent Business Media which is owned by News Corp Australia.

== History ==
Business Spectator was launched on 30 October 2007. It was established by journalists Alan Kohler, Stephen Bartholomeusz, Robert Gottliebsen and Eric Beecher, with financial backing from John Wylie and Mark Carnegie, and with a target audience of business people.

== Sell out ==
Australian Independent Business Media was sold to News Corp Australia in 2012 for A$30,000,000, after Fairfax Media was out-bid. In 2014 a subscription system was introduced for the website, with columns by the main contributors placed behind a paywall.

== See also ==
- CNN Business
