= European Association for Chinese Studies =

International scholarly association representing China scholars from Europe

The European Association for Chinese Studies (simplified Chinese: 欧洲汉学学会; traditional Chinese: 歐洲漢學學會; pinyin: Ōuzhōu Hànxué Xuéhuì; EACS) is an international scholarly association representing China scholars from Europe. It was founded in 1975 and is registered in Paris. The Association is governed by a Board and its daily activities are managed by its president, secretary-general, and treasurer.

== EACS Conferences ==
Conferences have been held biennially since 1976. The EACS holds a four-day conference devoted to planned programs of scholarly papers, roundtable discussions, workshops, and panel sessions on a wide range of issues in research and teaching.With over 600 presenting participants in over 150 panels in Leipzig in 2021, it is one of the greatest conferences on Chinese Studies worldwide.

- 2026 - 26th biennial conference of the European Association for Chinese Studies (EACS), Venice
- 2024 - 25th biennial conference of the European Association for Chinese Studies (EACS), Tallinn
- 2022 - 24th biennial conference of the European Association for Chinese Studies (EACS), Olomouc
- 2021 - 23rd biennial conference of the European Association for Chinese Studies (EACS), Leipzig
- 2018 - 22nd biennial conference of the European Association for Chinese Studies (EACS), Glasgow
- 2016 - 21st EACS Conference, St Petersburg
- 2014 - 20th EACS Conference, Braga
- 2012 - 19th EACS Conference, Paris
- 2010 - 18th EACS Conference, Riga ("Culture is a Crowded Bridge")
- 2008 - 17th EACS Conference, Lund
- 2006 - 16th EACS Conference, Ljubiljana
- 2004 - 15th EACS Conference, Heidelberg
- 2002 - 14th EACS Conference, Moscow: “Chinese Traditional Civilization and the Contemporary World”
- 2000 - 13th EACS Conference, Turin (Torino): “The Spirit of the Metropolis”
- 1998 - 12th EACS Conference, Edinburgh: “Festivals - the Chinese at Work and at Play”
- 1996 - 11th EACS Conference, Barcelona: “China and the Outer world”
- 1994 - 10th EACS Conference, Prague (Praha): “Genius loci: Place, Region, and Chinese Region-alism”
- 1992 - 9th EACS Conference, Paris: “Change-ment et idées de changement en Chine”
- 1990 - 8th EACS Conference, Leiden
- 1988 - 7th EACS Conference, Weimar
- 1986 - 6th EACS Conference, Turin (Torino)
- 1984 - 5th EACS Conference, Tübingen: “China - Present and Past“
- 1982 - 4th EACS Conference, Cambridge
- 1980 - 3rd EACS Conference, Zürich: “China: Continuity and Change”
- 1978 - 2nd EACS Conference, Ortisei - St. Ulrich: “Understanding Modern China: Problems and Methods”
- 1976 - 1st EACS Conference, Paris: “Popular and Official Traditions in China”

The conferences replaced the annual Junior Sinologues Conferences that had been taking place since 1948:

- 1972 - 24th JS Conference, Leiden (Noordwijkerhout)
- 1971 - 23rd JS Conference, Oxford
- 1970 - 22nd JS Conference, Stockholm
- 1969 - 21st JS Conference, Senegallia / Marcerata
- 1968 - 20th JS Conference, Prague [cancelled]
- 1967 - 19th JS Conference, Bochum
- 1966 - 18th JS Conference, Copenhagen-Humblebaek
- 1965 - 17th JS Conference, Leeds
- 1964 - 16th JS Conference, Bordeaux
- 1963 - 15th JS Conference, Torino
- 1962 - 14th JS Conference, Breukelen-Nijenrode
- 1961 - 13th JS Conference, Hamburg
- 1960- Moscow [cancelled]
- 1959 - 12th JS Conference, Cambridge
- 1958 - 11th JS Conference, Padua and Venice
- 1957 - 10th JS Conference, Marburg
- 1956 - 9th JS Conference, Paris
- 1955 - 8th JS Conference, Leiden (Oud-Poelgeest)
- 1954 - 7th JS Conference, Durham
- 1953 - 6th JS Conference, Rome
- 1952 - 5th JS Conference, Cologne (Köln-Wahn)
- 1951 - 4th JS Conference, Paris
- 1950 - 3rd JS Conference, London
- 1949 - 2nd JS Conference, Leiden
- 1948 - 1st JS Conference, Cambridge, London, and Oxford

== Journal ==
Since 2020, the Association has published a scholarly journal annually. The Journal of the European Association for Chinese Studies is an "open-access and peer-reviewed journal that fosters academic discussion and exchange on China- and Chinese-related topics. It is organized and financed by the European Association for Chinese Studies (EACS)".

== See also ==
- Braga Incident
