= Outline of education in China =

The following outline is provided as an overview of and topical guide to education in China:

== Education by location ==
- Education in China
  - Exams
    - Gaokao
    - Senior High School Entrance Examination
- Education in Hong Kong
  - Exams and exam authority
    - Hong Kong Examinations and Assessment Authority
    - Heung Shing
    - Hong Kong Advanced Level Examination
    - Hong Kong Certificate of Education Examination
    - Hong Kong Diploma of Secondary Education
    - Hong Kong Higher Level Examination
    - Secondary School Entrance Examination
  - Cram schools in Hong Kong
- Education in Macau
- Education in Taiwan
  - Exams
    - Basic Competence Test for Junior High School Students
    - Comprehensive Assessment Program for Junior High School Students
    - General Scholastic Ability Test
  - Scholarships in Taiwan
    - Huayu Enrichment Scholarship
    - Taiwan Scholarship
  - Engineering education in Taiwan
  - Secondary education in Taiwan
  - List of Chinese language schools in Taiwan for foreign students
- Chinese school

== Historical perspectives ==
- History of education in China
- Imperial examination
  - Zhuangyuan

== Educational institutions ==
- Academies of Classical Learning
  - Culai Academy
  - White Deer Grotto Academy
  - Yuelu Academy
- Taixue
- Academies
  - Guozijian
  - Donglin Academy
  - Dongpo Academy
  - Hanlin Academy
  - Shang Xiang
- Famous four universities in republican China
  - National Central University
  - National Southwestern Associated University
  - Wuhan University
  - Zhejiang University

== See also ==
- Outline of education
