= International Chinese Language Program =

Chinese language learning institute at National Taiwan University in Taipei

- 國際華語研習所
- Affiliations: National Taiwan University
- Location: Taipei, Taiwan; 25.016°N 121.536°E
- Colors: Maroon and gold
- Website: iclp.ntu.edu.tw

The International Chinese Language Program (ICLP; Chinese: 國際華語研習所) is an institution for intensive training in formal Mandarin, Taiwanese, Classical Chinese, and other varieties of Chinese. It is located in Gongguan, Taipei, on the main campus of National Taiwan University (NTU).

== History ==
The center was established in 1961 by Stanford University to meet the stringent research and educational needs of Stanford University students. In 1963, the Inter−University Board was created and the official name became the Inter−University Program for Chinese Language Studies (IUP), commonly referred to as the "Stanford Center," with several top American universities contributing funds and participating in the center. Owing to the quality of the teachers and materials, as well as the intensity of instruction, this program quickly became the world's premier center for the intensive study of Mandarin Chinese, training several generations of the world's top sinologists, including professors, diplomats, and business leaders.

In 1997, a new IUP was established at Tsinghua University in Beijing, China. National Taiwan University assumed full administration of the program in Taiwan, and the name was changed to the "International Chinese Language Program at National Taiwan University" (ICLP). Though it changed its name, ICLP continued with the same teachers, same course materials, and same traditions as an elite Chinese training program, with the same level of intensive instruction and small classes that have made it the standard against which other Mandarin training programs are measured. ICLP has produced and continues to produce some of the best known texts for instruction in Mandarin. In January 2006, ICLP, though long-associated with National Taiwan University and having always been located there, was finally formally merged into NTU as an institute of the university.

== Coursework ==
The normal courseload for students is three one-hour classes with no more than four students a class plus an additional hour of personal instruction. The student to faculty ratio at ICLP is less than 3:1. ICLP follows an approximately 10-week quarter system, with Fall, Winter, Spring, and Summer sessions (the summer session is just 8 weeks). Students who wish to study at ICLP can choose from several options. First is the year-long program, beginning in mid-September and ending in June or August, depending on the student's choice for the optional summer session. Second, students may also join just the optional summer session running from June to August. Third, there is a quarter program offered in line with the calendar of many California universities, in order to meet the needs of students studying abroad on a quarter system. In addition, sometimes students attend for just a single quarter (Fall, Winter, Spring or Summer) for remedial study or for college credit. Besides classwork, students practice outside class in a Mandarin-speaking environment that upholds much of its traditional Chinese heritage and culture within the framework of a modern democratic society.

Previously, ICLP did not accept beginner students, but due to overwhelming interest, ICLP now also offers intense instruction at the beginner level. Besides the full complement of courses in spoken and written Chinese from beginner to advanced levels, ICLP is one of the few Chinese language schools to offer beginner and advanced courses in Classical Chinese and Taiwanese. Classes in Chinese Calligraphy and creative writing are also offered. Cantonese and Hakka have also previously been offered. Students also have the opportunity to audit courses at National Taiwan University.

== Scholarships ==
Besides graduate student grants, some ICLP students are also recipients of scholarships granted by the Blakemore Foundation and the Taipei Economic and Cultural Representative Office (TECRO). U.S. applicants to the Huayu Enrichment Scholarship apply through their regional TECRO Cultural Division. U.S. applicants to the Scholarship Program for Advanced Mandarin Studies apply through the Washington D.C. Taipei Economic and Cultural Representative Office Cultural Division.

== Alumni ==
- David Coates, British diplomat, former Director General of the British Trade & Cultural Office in Taipei and Ambassador to the Ivory Coast.
- Weldon South Coblin, linguist and sinologist
- Joseph Esherick, historian, professor of modern Chinese history at University of California, San Diego
- Philip J. Ivanhoe, historian of Chinese thought, particularly of Confucianism and Neo-Confucianism
- R. F. Kuang, American writer
- Rodger Krouse, Co-Founder and Co-Chief Executive Officer of Sun Capital Partners
- Mark Edward Lewis, scholar of early Chinese history
- B. Lynn Pascoe, United States Foreign Service Officer, former Under-Secretary-General of the United Nations for Political Affairs
- Colin Pine, interpreter for Chinese basketball star Yao Ming
- Shawna Yang Ryan, novelist, author, and professor
- P. Steven Sangren, a leading American anthropologist of Chinese religion
- Haun Saussy, University Professor of Comparative Literature at the University of Chicago
- Meir Shahar, professor in the Department of East Asian Studies at Tel Aviv University
- David Shambaugh, professor of political science and international affairs at George Washington University, as well as a non-resident senior fellow at the Brookings Institution
- David Spindler, independent American scholar of the Great Wall of China and one of its leading researchers
- Tad Waddington, author, translator/interpreter, and businessman
- Robin Winkler, attorney and environmental activist
- Edward Wong, American journalist and a foreign correspondent for The New York Times

== See also ==
- Chinese Language Center (CLC) of National Dong Hwa University (NDHU)
- Mandarin Training Center (MTC) of National Taiwan Normal University (NTNU)
- Mandarin Learning Center (MLC) at Chinese Culture University
- List of Chinese language schools in Taiwan for foreign students
