= Taipei Language Institute =

Mandarin and Taiwan-Hokkien language institute in Taipei, Taiwan

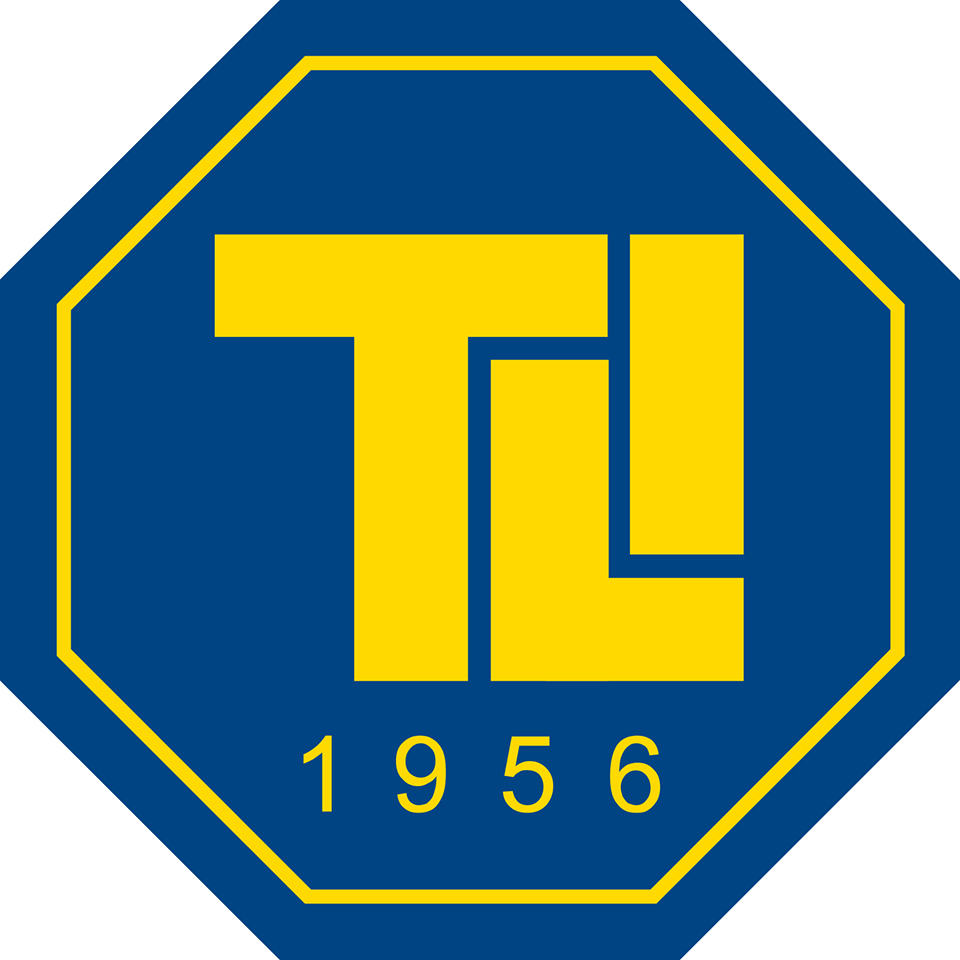

Location
- Taipei; Taiwan
- Coordinates: 25°1′21.7″N 121°31′31.74″E

Information
- Type: Language School
- Established: 1956
- Founder: Dr. Marvin C. Ho (何景賢)
- Average class size: 2 to 6
- Website: http://www.tli.com.tw/

The Taipei Language Institute (TLI; Chinese: 中華語文研習所; pinyin: Zhōnghuá Yǔwén Yánxí Suǒ) was founded in 1956 by a group of missionaries who wished to provide training in Mandarin Chinese for Taiwan-bound missionaries. Originally named Missionary Language Institute, the founder Dr. Marvin Ho created the institute as a means of educating these foreigners in Mandarin and Taiwanese.

== History ==
As the demand for language instruction of foreigners increased, the institute soon found that it could no longer limit itself to training missionaries. In 1958, the school expanded its enterprise and took the name of Taipei Language Institute. It opened its doors to any foreigners aspiring to study Chinese and Chinese heritage in Taiwan.

From the humble beginnings of the first TLI Institute which started with 30 students in Taipei, TLI has grown exponentially over the years to 16 centers across the globe - in Taiwan, China, Japan, the United States, and Canada. TLI has trained tens of thousands of students worldwide, and has instructed clients from a wide range of professions: diplomatic personnel, international businesspeople, engineers, journalists, missionaries, professors, authors, college students, and overseas Chinese. TLI has prepared hundreds of variations of textbooks and materials covering dozens of different subject matter ranging in difficult level. Courses at TLI are mostly small-group classes of 2-6 students or private tutorials and rigorous audiolingual methods are employed. TLI has compiled many of its own materials, but beginning with the high-intermediate level, students are given the freedom to design their own curriculum based on current or anticipated job needs. It is also possible to study mainland Chinese material which uses simplified characters. The Taipei Language Institute also works in close partnership with the American Institute in Taiwan at their Chinese language school in Yangmingshan to provide full-time, advanced training in speaking and reading Mandarin Chinese for diplomatic personnel and employees who need to attain professional proficiency.

== Timeline ==
1959: TLI signed a contract with the U.S. Department of State to train American diplomats in Taiwan, including the personnel of the American Embassy, Military Assistance Advisory Group and Mutual Defense Headquarters. This relationship lasted 20 years, only ending when diplomatic relations between the Republic of China and the U.S. broke off in 1979.

1967: Dr. Marvin Ho, president of TLI, established the Department of Chinese Studies at the University of Delhi in India and designed its curriculum. A large number of Indian students enrolled and later became Chinese translators and interpreters in all levels of Indian Government.

1971: By invitation of the Hong Kong Christian Association, TLI established a Chinese Language Institute in Kowloon, which consisted of the Mandarin Language Department and Cantonese Language Department, for the training of foreign religious groups, businesspeople, diplomats, and locals.

1996: TLI expanded into mainland China and Japan.

2000: TLI established an American campus in San Jose, California

2009: TLI and Beijing Language and Culture University (BLCU) signed an agreement on 28 April that grants TLI the exclusive right to conduct Hanyu Shuiping Kaoshi examinations in the Taiwan area.

== Notable alumni ==
- J. Stapleton Roy - American diplomat specializing in Asian affairs
- John K. Fairbank - American academic and founder of the Center for Asian Research at Harvard University.
- Charles W. Freeman, Jr. - American Diplomat and Chair in China Studies at Center for Strategic and International Studies
- Ma Ying-Jeou - President of the Republic of China (Taiwanese Language Study)
- Nicholas D. Kristof - American journalist, author, op-ed columnist, and a winner of two Pulitzer Prizes
- Eunice S. Reddick - American diplomat
- C. Martin Wilbur - Professor of Chinese History at Columbia University
- Christopher Doyle - Award-winning Cinematographer
- Afaa M. Weaver - American Poet

== See also ==
- List of Chinese language schools in Taiwan
