= Foshan No.1 High School =

School in Foshan, Guangdong, China

- 佛山市第一中学
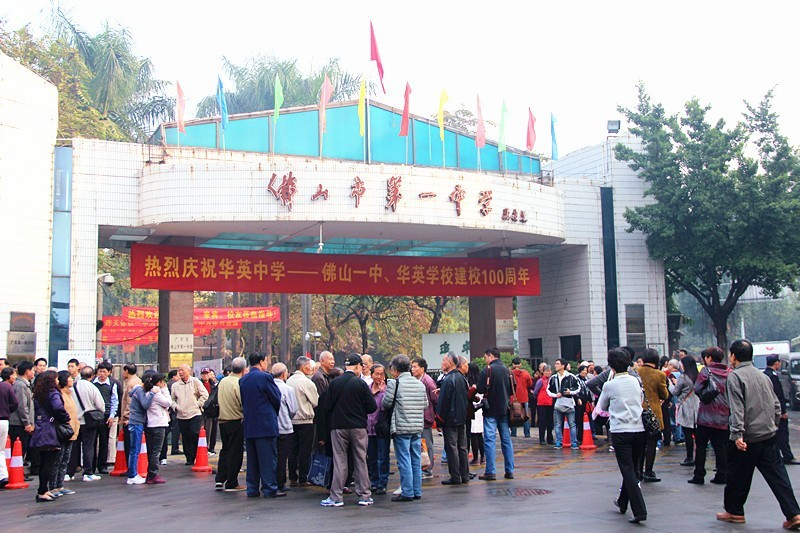
- The school gate on the 100th anniversary day
- No.25 Wensha Road, Chancheng District, Foshan, Guangdong, China

Information
- School type: Public Boarding Senior High School
- Motto: 科学与人文并举 规范与个性共存 鸿鹄志 家国情 书卷气 儒雅风 内美修能 上下求索 (Science and humanities develop simultaneously and norms coexist with individuality. Ambitious, Patriotic, Academic, Elegant. Persistent in dignity, arduous in exploration.)
- Established: 1913
- School district: Guangdong, China
- Principal: Genlin Tan (谭根林)
- Faculty: 250
- Enrolment: 3400
- Language: Chinese (Simplified Chinese, Mandarin) English (British English, in English lessons only)
- Website: http://www.fsyz.com.cn

Foshan No.1 High School
- Simplified Chinese: 佛山市第一中学
- Traditional Chinese: 佛山市第一中學
- Literal meaning: Foshan City No. 1 Secondary School
Transcriptions
Standard Mandarin
- Hanyu Pinyin: Fóshānshì Dìyī Zhōngxué
Yue: Cantonese
- Jyutping: fat6 saan1 si5 dai6 jat1 zung1 hok6

Foshan Shuibengchang High School
- Simplified Chinese: 佛山水泵厂中学
- Traditional Chinese: 佛山水泵廠中學
- Literal meaning: Foshan Water Pump Factory Secondary School
Transcriptions
Standard Mandarin
- Hanyu Pinyin: Fóshān Shuǐbèng Chǎng Zhōngxué
Yue: Cantonese
- Jyutping: fat6 saan1 seoi2 bam1 cong2 zung1 hok6

Foshan No.1 High School (simplified Chinese: 佛山市第一中学; traditional Chinese: 佛山市第一中學; pinyin: Fóshān Shì Dì Yī Zhōngxué), also known as No.1 Middle School of Foshan, Foshan No.1 Middle School, FSYZ (pinyin abbreviation), is a high school in Guangdong, China. The school was established in 1913 as Wa Ying High School (simplified Chinese: 华英中学; traditional Chinese: 華英中學; pinyin: Huá Yīng Zhōngxué), and was renamed to Foshan No. 1 High School in August 1955. During the Cultural Revolution, the school was once called Shuibengchang Middle School of Foshan (佛山水泵厂中学; 佛山水泵廠中學; Fóshān Shuǐbèngchǎng Zhōngxué) but restored afterward.

As of 2021, the school has 75 classes, including 3 specifically designated for Tibetan students. From Grade 10–12, each grade has 24 classes. The school in total has more than 3,200 students, served by 306 teaching staff members, and 137 senior teachers. The school is the only boarding high school directly subordinate to Foshan's Municipal Education Bureau. The school has also received numerous awards and designations from the country's Ministry of Education.

== History ==
=== Qing dynasty (1853–1911) ===
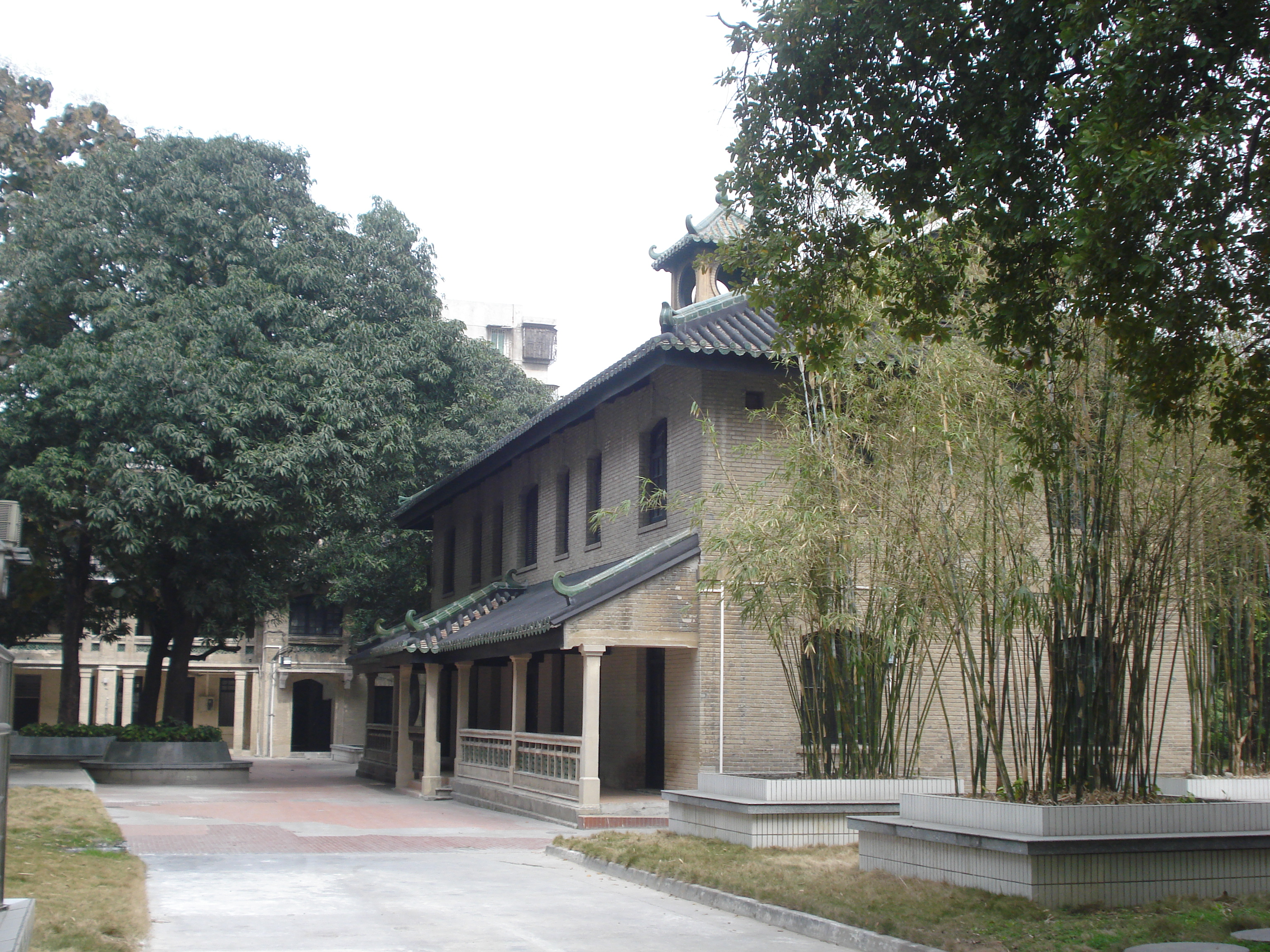
Traditional Buildings in Foshan No.1 High School

In 1853, the South China diocese of British Methodist Church established its first church and an affiliated school in Guangzhou. After that, several schools were established by the church in Guangdong. In 1909, Rev. S. George Tope, a priest of the church purchased 20 acres of land in Wenchangsha, Foshan for school establishment.

=== Republic of China (1911–1949) ===
In 1912, the Methodist Church began to establish a school on the purchased land. In 1913, the school opened. The first principal was Rev. C. A. Gimblett. In memory of Dr. Haigh's contribution to Chinese Education, the school was first named "Haigh College". Soon after its opening, the name was changed into "Wa Ying College" (華英學校), which indicates that the school represents a combination of Chinese ("Wa" 華) and British ("Ying" 英) education. At the time, the school recruited male students only.

In 1920, Reverend Arthur H. Bray (Chinese: 黎伯廉), the second principal of Wa Ying Middle School, raised money for expanding the school and building a new school recruiting female students. The new girl school was established in 1923.

During the World War II, the school underwent significant changes. The boy school and the girl school were combined due to the shortage of schoolhouses. In order to avoid the Japanese invaders, the school has moved to several places including Hong Kong, which laid a foundation for the establishment of Hong Kong-based Wa Ying College in 1969. After the war, Wa Ying Middle School moved back to its original site in Wenchangsha, Foshan and re-opened in November 1946.

=== People's Republic of China (1949–today) ===
After the establishment of the People's Republic of China, Wa Ying Middle School was confiscated by the government and transformed into the current public school "No.1 Middle School of Foshan". It took on the new name, Foshan No. 1 High School in 1955. At first, the school was a public junior and senior high school with students from grade 7 to 12. In 1999, the junior high school department was separated from the school and became an independent junior high school called Foshan Huaying School. Since then, Foshan No.1 High School has only had students from grade 10-12 (except for Tibetan Department).

In October 1995, the school was assigned to open a Junior High School Department of Tibetan Students (also called Tibetan Department) by the Ministry of Education. Students recruited from Tibet attend the school during grades 7–9.

On December 8, 2013, the school celebrated its 100th anniversary.

== Campus and buildings ==
The campus area of Foshan No.1 High School spans an area of about 200 mu, and has a floor area of 122,600 square metres (30.3 acres).

The school's campus hosts a number of historic buildings, which date back to the 1910s and 1920s, and fuse British and Chinese architectural styles. Due to their century-long history, these traditional and historical type buildings are all under the legitimate protection from the government. Notable surviving buildings from that era include:

- A dormitory building designed by the school's second principal, Arthur H. Bray (Chinese: 黎伯廉), the oldest surviving building on campus. The building was constructed in 1918, and inaugurated on May 30, 1919.
- The school's medical office, located in a building which dates back to 1923, and hosts a bell tower.
- One of the boy's dormitory buildings, which dates back to 1923.
- The "white house" (Chinese: 白屋; pinyin: bái wū; Jyutping: baak6 uk1), a building built in 1924 which houses foreign teachers, and earns its name due to its distinctly white exterior.
- The "coffin alley" (Chinese: 棺材巷; pinyin: guāncai xiàng; Jyutping: gun1coi4 hong6), the school's old library building, built in 1924. It now houses a school museum and alumni center, and derives its name from the style of pavers used to surround it.
- The old principal building, built in 1924, which now is used as an activity center for teachers.

Other older buildings on the school's campus include the "red building" (simplified Chinese: 红楼; traditional Chinese: 紅樓; pinyin: hóng lóu), which was built in 1947, and is used as a resting place for female teachers, as well as an old teaching building now used as a dining hall staff dormitory, and an old dormitory building now used as a male teacher dormitory.

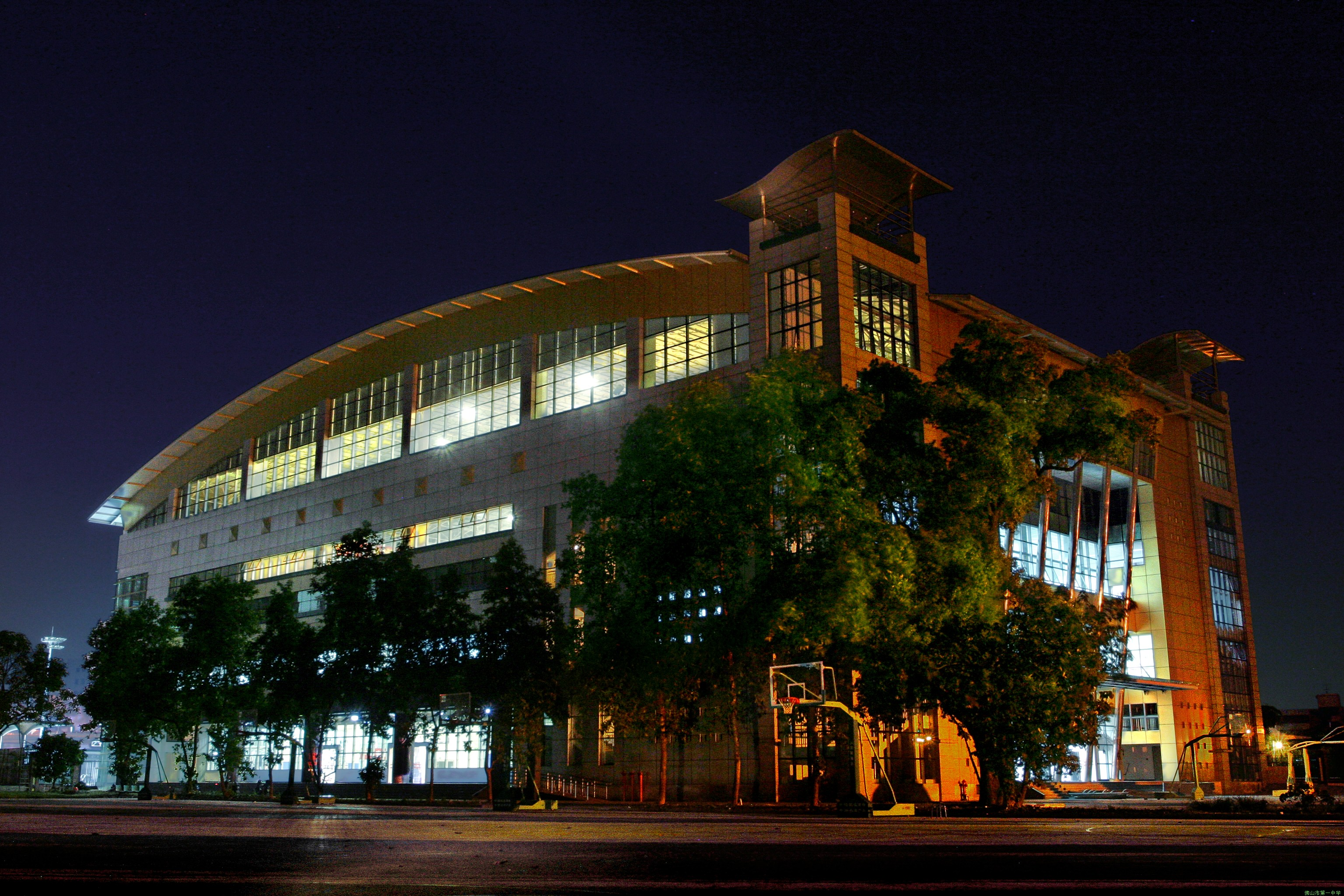
Sports Center

== Academics ==
=== National Higher Education Entrance Examination (Gaokao) ===
In the 2016 Gaokao, five students under both divisions ranked top 100 in the province. 87.5% of the students scored above the division I college borderline and 99.12% scored above the division II borderline.

In the 2021 Gaokao, 5 students under physics division ranked top 50 in the province and 4 under history division ranked top 50 in the province. 12 students are 95.2% of the students scored above the division I college borderline.

=== Competitions ===
Every year students of No.1 High School of Foshan won awards from national academic competitions including National Senior High School Mathematics Competition, National High School Student Physics Competition, etc. In 2011, students won 34 1st prizes in different national STEM competitions.

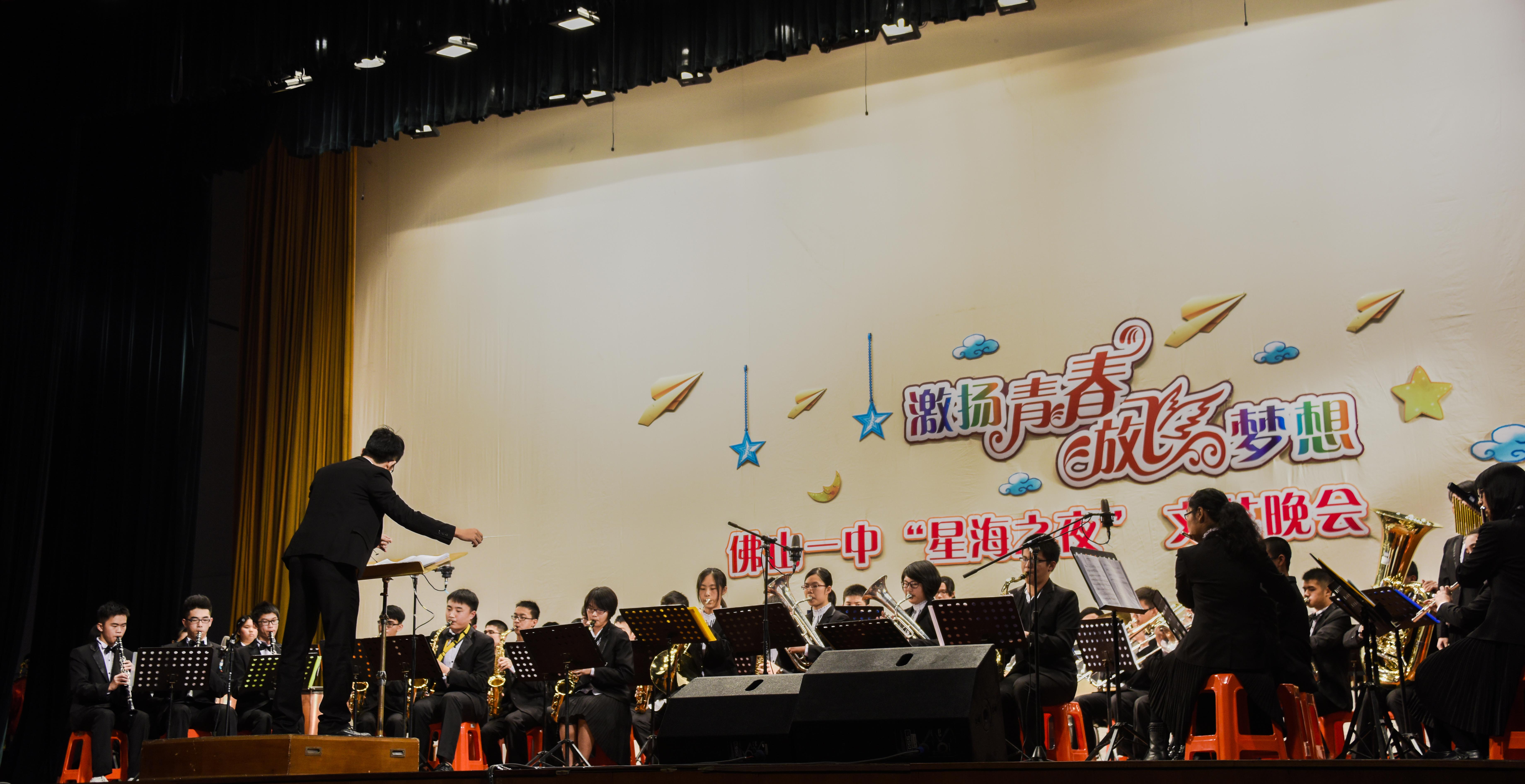
Wind Ensemble on Sing-Hoi Evening Show

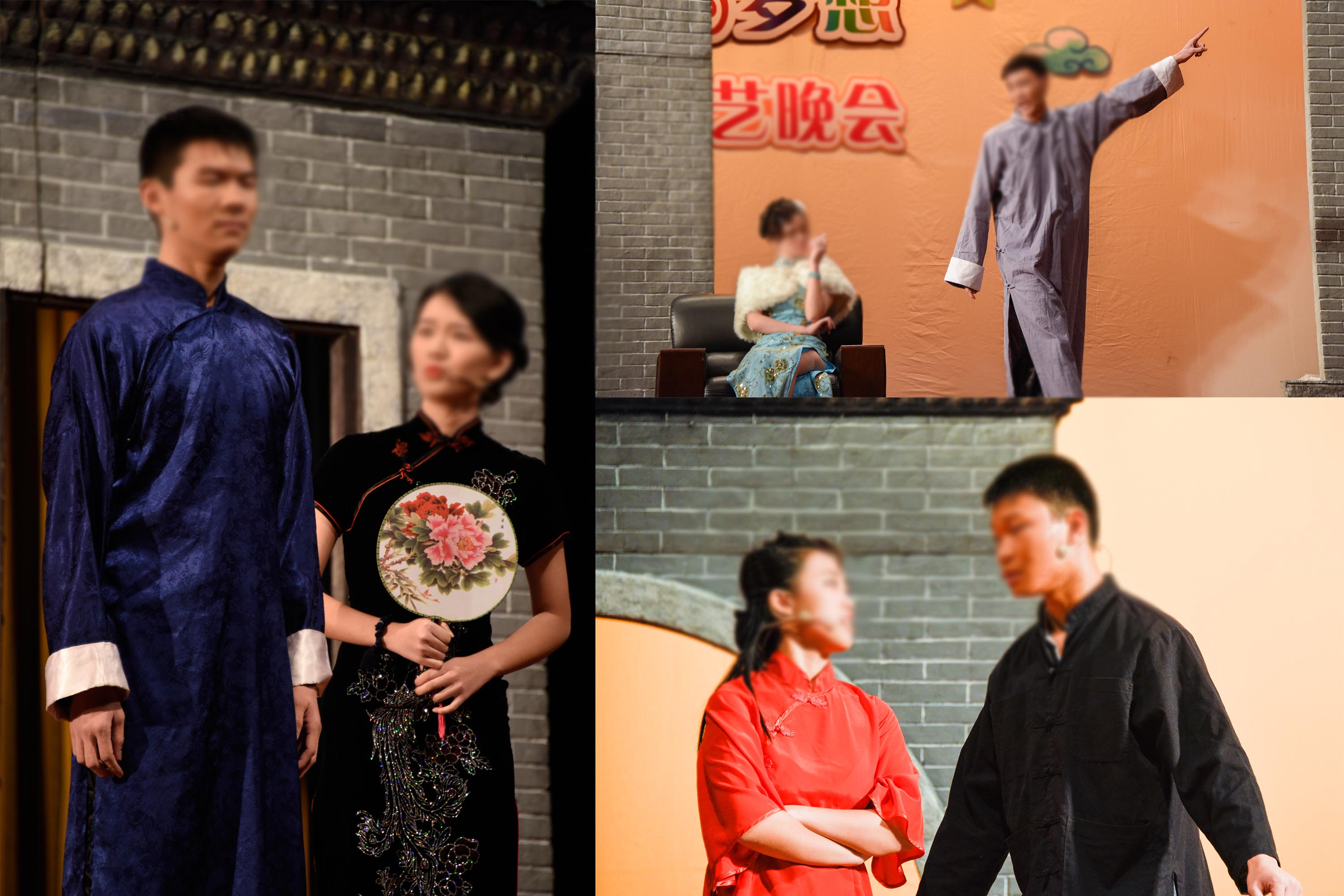
Yongfeng Club of Drama on Sing-Hoi Evening Show

== Notable alumni ==
- Steven N. S. Cheung - economist
- Huang Benli - chemist
- Pan He - sculptor
- Pang Xiongfei - entomologist
- Peng Jiamu - biochemist, explorer
- Sinn Sing Hoi - musician, composer
- Ye Xuanping - Chinese politician

== Notable teachers ==
- Tim Walz – taught English and U.S. History in 1989.

== See also ==
- Wa Ying College
