= Wa Ying College =

Secondary school in Hong Kong

Coordinates: 22°19′10.24″N 114°10′57.3″E

Wa Ying College Chinese: 華英中學
- 8 Sheung Wo Street, Homantin, Kowloon; Hong Kong

Information
- School type: Aided Secondary
- Motto: We work together, We care, We serve. Chinese: 合作 關懷 服務
- Established: 1913 (Foshan, Guangdong), 112–113 years ago 1971 re-established (Homantin, Hong Kong), 54–55 years ago
- School district: Kowloon City
- Principal: Dr Wun Chi Wa
- Staff: 65
- Grades: F.1 - F.6
- Gender: Co-educational
- Enrollment: about 800
- Houses: Sun , Moon , Sky , Ocean
- Newspaper: "Lustre" Chinese: 華采
- Affiliation: The Methodist Church, Hong Kong
- Supervisor: Rev. Dr. Lam Sung Che
- Website: www.waying.edu.hk

Wa Ying College
- Traditional Chinese: 華英中學
- Simplified Chinese: 华英中学
Transcriptions
Standard Mandarin
- Hanyu Pinyin: Huá Yīng Zhōngxué
Yue: Cantonese
- Jyutping: waa4 jing1 zung1 hok6

Wa Ying College (also referred to as WYC, Chinese: 華英中學) is a secondary school in Hong Kong, located at 8 Sheung Wo Street, Homantin, Kowloon, Hong Kong. The school is managed by the Methodist Church, Hong Kong.

== History ==
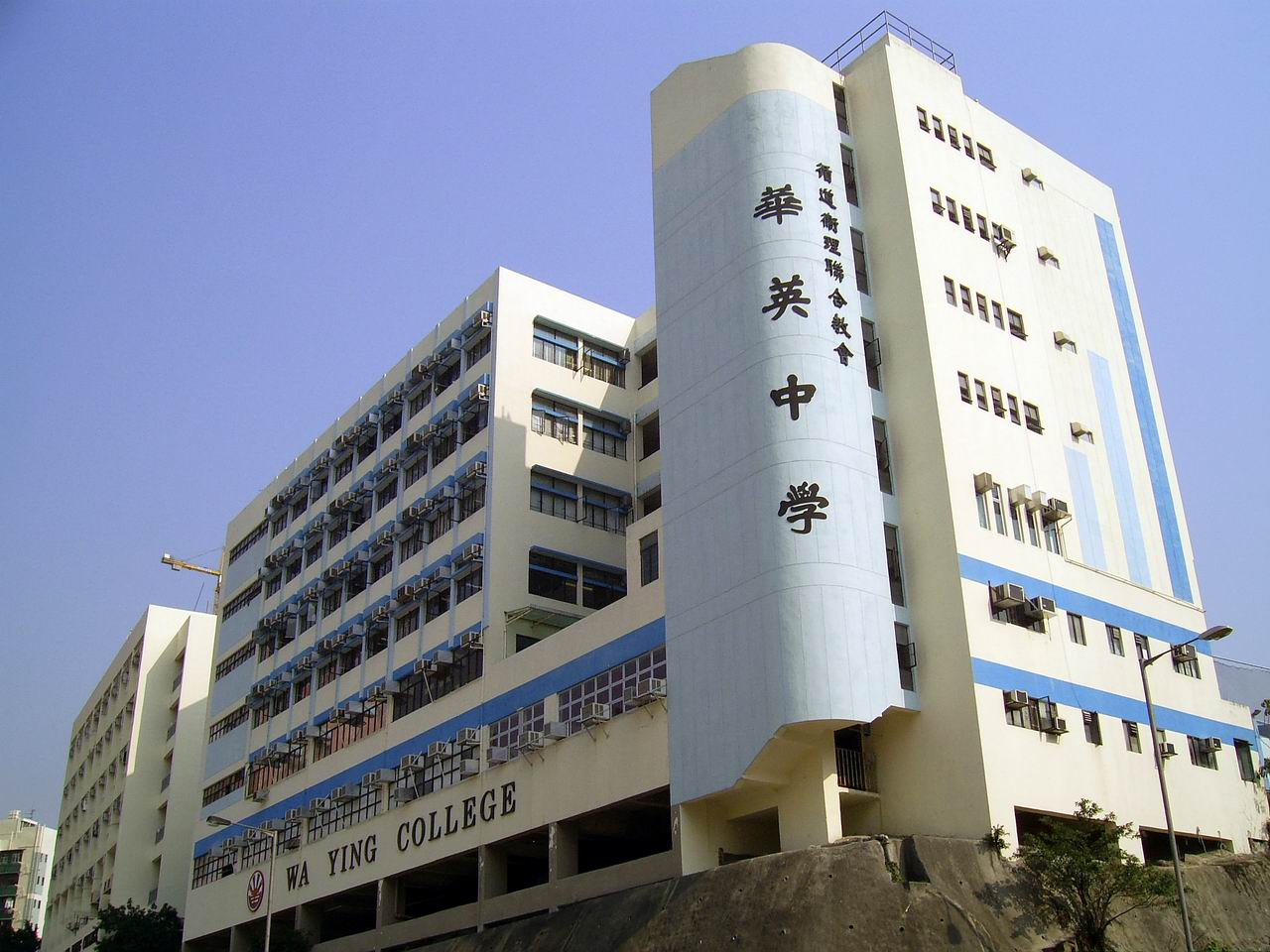
School building

Wa Ying College was founded as Wa Ying Middle School (Chinese name 華英中學) by the Methodist Church in 1913 in Foshan of Guangdong, China. The school quickly established itself as one of the three most prestigious middle schools in pre-World War II southern China. During the War, the school relocated to Hong Kong in Tung Chung Fort, Tung Chung, Lantau Island and later moved to Shatin. It returned to Foshan after the War. In 1951, after the Chinese Communist Party came to power in mainland China, the Foshan-based Wa Ying Middle School was confiscated by the state owing to the People's Republic of China's atheist Communist ideology, under which religious organizations-run schools are not allowed to operate. The Foshan No.1 Middle School was formed after the authorities merged the former Wa Ying Middle School with the public run Foshan Middle School (佛山中學; pinyin Foshan Zhongxue) and sited at the former Wa Ying Middle School.

In 1969, alumni of Wa Ying Middle School based in Hong Kong handed a proposal to the Chinese Methodist Church to re-establish the school in Hong Kong, then out of the People's Republic of China's control. The alumni pledged to raise funds to start the building project and entrusted the school to the Church as in the past. With less than 400 alumni, nearly $300,000 was raised. In addition to a loan of $250,000 and a subsidy of two million dollars granted from the Hong Kong Government, the dream of resuming the school came true. Construction work began at its present site at Ho Man Tin in 1970.

In September 1971, named Wa Ying College in English while keeping the Chinese name of its Foshan predecessor, started with 18 teachers and 12 classes. The school gradually expanded to up to 31 classes by the 1983-84 academic year. The school campus has undergone a number of renovations over the years, with the most recent at the late 2005. The school joined the Voluntary Optimisation of Class Structure Scheme and reduced to 24 classes by the 2011-12 academic year.

In 2021 there was a proposal for the Hong Kong Legislative Council to spend $470 million Hong Kong dollars on renovating the school, but the renovation was voted down. RTHK noted that Wun Chi-wa, the principal, opposed the 2019 Hong Kong Extradition Bill previously proposed in the Legco.

== See also ==
- Education in Hong Kong
- List of mainland Chinese schools reopened in Hong Kong
