= ZHC =

China's test of Mandarin proficiency for its citizens

The ZHC (simplified Chinese: 职业汉语能力测试; traditional Chinese: 職業漢語能力測試; pinyin: Zhíyè Hànyǔ Nénglì Cèshì; lit. 'Professional Chinese Ability Test') is a test held by the Ministry of Human Resources and Social Security of the People's Republic of China to test Chinese citizens' proficiency in Mandarin Chinese.

== Purpose and history ==
This exam tests the candidates' ability to use Chinese in their professional activities. Those who pass the test are issued the certificate of occupational Chinese testing: elementary level, intermediate level or advanced level.

ZHC was formally launched in 2004. It is held on the second Sunday in March, June, September and December annually.

== See also ==
- Hanyu Shuiping Kaoshi – a test for non-native speakers administered by China
- Test of Chinese as a Foreign Language – a test for non-native speakers administered by Taiwan
- List of language proficiency tests
