= Test of Chinese as a Foreign Language =

Taiwan's test of Mandarin proficiency for non-native speakers

- Logo of the TOCFL

- A TOCFL Certificate
- Traditional Chinese: 華語文能力測驗
- Simplified Chinese: 华语文能力测验
Transcriptions
Standard Mandarin
- Hanyu Pinyin: Huáyǔwén Nénglì Cèyàn
- Bopomofo: ㄏㄨㄚˊ ㄩˇ ㄨㄣˊ ㄋㄥˊ ㄌㄧˋ ㄘㄜˋ ㄧㄢˋ
- Tongyong Pinyin: Huáyǔwún Nénglì Cèyàn
- Yale Romanization: Hwáyǔwén Nénglì Tsèyàn
- IPA: [xwǎỳwə̌n nə̌ŋlî tsʰɤ̂jɛ̂n]
Southern Min
- Hokkien POJ: Hôa-gú-bûn Lêng-le̍k Chhek-giām

Logo of the SC-TOP

The Test of Chinese as a Foreign Language (TOCFL; Chinese: 華語文能力測驗; pinyin: Huáyǔwén Nénglì Cèyàn) is the standardized proficiency test of Taiwanese Mandarin for non-native speakers in Taiwan. The test was formerly known as the TOP or Test Of Proficiency-Huayu.

It is the result of a joint project of the Mandarin Training Center, the Graduate Institute of Teaching Chinese as a Second Language, and the Psychological Testing Center of National Taiwan Normal University. The research project started in August 2001, and tests were first held in 2003. So far, it has served test takers from over 60 countries. The new version of TOCFL, which was in development since 2008, became available in 2013.

The new version of the TOCFL has four proficiency bands: Novice, Band A, Band B, and Band C. Each of the bands has two levels. Therefore, there are a total of eight levels: Novice 1 and 2, followed by Levels 1 to 6. The items on the test of each level are 50 multiple choice items, to be answered in 60 minutes. Test takers can choose the test levels best suited to them based on their Chinese language proficiency and learning background. The former version (until 2013) had only five levels.

For children aged 7–12, an age-specific test exists called the Children's Chinese Competency Certification (or CCCC, 兒童華語文能力測驗; Értóng Huáyǔwén Nénglì Cèyàn).

The test cannot be taken in mainland China, Hong Kong or Macao, where only the PRC's HSK exam can be taken. Conversely, the HSK exam is not available in Taiwan.

== History of SC-TOP ==
The test is administered by the Steering Committee for the Test Of Proficiency-Huayu (SC-TOP, 國家華語測驗推動工作委員會; Guójiā Huáyǔ Cèyàn Tuīdòng Gōngzuò Wěiyuánhuì). The committee is under the direction of Taiwan's Ministry of Education.

The Steering Committee for the Test Of Proficiency-Huayu (SC-TOP) was established in November 2005 under the direction of the Republic of China's Ministry of Education. Originally called the Chinese Language Testing Center and renamed in January 2007, the Committee aims to develop and promote an effective Chinese assessment system, mainly the Test of Chinese as a Foreign Language (TOCFL), for Chinese learners worldwide to assess their Chinese proficiency.

The SC-TOP has the following major missions:

- To design and plan the test contents of the TOCFL and CCCC exams
- To build test item pools for the TOCFL and CCCC exams
- To develop computer-based Chinese proficiency testing systems
- To promote Taiwan's Chinese proficiency tests for non-native speakers of Chinese
- To increase the exchange among Chinese proficiency testing organizations worldwide

== Purpose and use ==
TOCFL test takers who reach the level requirements will receive a certificate, which can serve as a credential of proficiency in Chinese for:

- Applying to the Taiwan Scholarship.
- Applying to academic programs at colleges or universities in Taiwan, as a reference for the subject of Chinese.
- Providing a job-required proof of language competency.

Currently some undergraduate and graduate programs in Taiwan adopt the TOCFL certificate as the requirement for admission or as the evaluation of an applicant's Chinese proficiency. In addition, many international businesses in Taiwan, such as LG, adopt TOCFL as a reference for their employee dispatch programs. Several overseas companies also refer to candidates' TOCFL certificates when recruiting.

== Examinants ==
The TOCFL is intended for non-native speakers of Mandarin. Those who wish to know their level of Mandarin Chinese proficiency, and those who want to study, work, or do business in Mandarin Chinese-speaking countries or contexts are welcome to register for the test. The following table sets out the suggested learning hours of Mandarin Chinese, and suggested vocabulary base at each test level.

Band	Level	Suggested Learning Hours	Number of words
Novice	Novice 1	30-120 hrs	300
Novice	Novice 2	30-120 hrs	300
A	Level 1	120-240 hrs	500
A	Level 2	240-360 hrs	1000
B	Level 3	360-480 hrs	2500
B	Level 4	480-960 hrs	5000
C	Level 5	960-1920 hrs	8000
C	Level 6	above 1920 hrs	8000

Please note:

1. The suggested number of course hours learning Mandarin Chinese required by overseas test-takers may need to be doubled. For example, the table indicates that Level 2 test-takers who take Mandarin Chinese courses in a Chinese-speaking country need to have completed 240–360 course hours. People taking courses in countries where other languages are spoken generally require 480–720 hours.
2. The suggested vocabulary list for each level can be found online

== Relationship with TBCL ==
Taiwan Benchmarks for the Chinese Language (臺灣華語文能力基準, TBCL) is a guideline developed by Taiwan's National Academy for Educational Research to describe seven levels of Chinese language proficiency. It includes lists which contains 3,100 Chinese characters, 14,425 words, and 496 grammar points.

For exams starting from August 2021, the TBCL ability level column will be added to the transcripts to help Chinese learners around the world understand the correspondence between TBCL, CEFR, and ACTFL guidelines. The TOCFL will also use the TBCL as one of the references for test design.

== Comparison with HSK ==
It is difficult to directly compare the Hanyu Shuiping Kaoshi (HSK) with the TOCFL.

Unlike TOCFL, the pre-2021 HSK had 6 levels. The six HSK levels and the six Band A, B and C TOCFL levels were all claimed to be compatible with the six levels of the Common European Framework of Reference for Languages (CEFR). However, for each test the number of words or characters required differs. For example, TOCFL generally requires more vocabulary at each level compared to the pre-2021 HSK.

In 2010, Hanban asserted that the HSK's six levels corresponded to the six levels of the Common European Framework of Reference for Languages (CEFR). However, the German, French and Italian associations of Chinese language teachers argued that HSK Level 6 is only equivalent to CEFR Level B1/B2/C1 (about TOCFL Level 4); thus rejecting Hanban's claim of equivalency.

The new Chinese Proficiency Standard, effective on July 1, 2021, adds 300 required characters to every level and adds three more levels, therefore the amount of words that must be studied increases exponentially. According to the new Chinese Proficiency Standard, levels 1, 2, 3, 4 in the coming HSK would be more difficult than its 2010 version, and less so in levels 5 and 6. The more difficult levels (7–9) would be equivalent to CEFR level C.

Estimated CEFR level	Level (HSK 2010)	Level (HSK Coming)	Level (TOCFL)	Level (TBCL)	Required words (HSK 2010／Coming)		Required words (TOCFL／TBCL)		Required characters (S) (HSK2010／Coming)		Required characters (T) (TBCL)
	Level 1 Level 2		Novice 1 Novice 2	Level 1	150; 300		160; 393	396	174; 347		246
Level A1; Level A2	Level 3 Level 4	Level 1 Level 2 Level 3	Level 1 Level 2	Level 2 Level 3	600; 1200	500; 1272; 2245	740; 1225	798; 1254	617; 1064	300; 600; 900	504; 801
Level B1; Level B2	Level 5 Level 6	Level 4 Level 5 Level 6	Level 3 Level 4	Level 4 Level 5	2500; 5000	3245; 4316; 5456	2399; 4741	2669; 5288	1685; 2663	1200; 1500; 1800	1300; 1900
Level C1; Level C2		Level 7 Level 8 Level 9	Level 5 Level 6	Level 6 Level 7		11092	7517	9432; 14425		3000	2500; 3100

== Format ==
TOCFL tests four language skills: Listening, Reading, Speaking, and Writing.

=== Listening ===
Novice has three sections. There are 25 multiple-choice questions in total. This test takes approximately 25 minutes.

Band A has four sections: Picture Description, Single-round Dialogue (questions with picture options), Multiple-round Dialogue (questions with picture options), and Dialogue (questions with text options). There are 50 multiple-choice questions in total. This test takes approximately 60 minutes.

Band B and Band C have two sections: Dialogue and Monologue. There are 50 multiple-choice questions with text options. This test takes approximately 60 minutes.

=== Reading ===
Novice has two sections. There are 25 multiple-choice questions in total. This test takes 25 minutes.

Band A has five sections: Sentence Comprehension, Picture Description, Gap Filling, Paragraph Completion, and Reading Comprehension. There are 45 multiple-choice questions and 5 matching questions. This test takes 60 minutes.

Bands B and C have two sections: Gap Filling and Reading Comprehension. Each test consists of 50 multiple-choice questions and takes 60 minutes.

=== Speaking ===
The TOCFL Speaking test adopts a holistic scoring approach, taking into account the content, fluency, and language skills of the test taker. The results are presented in the form of scale scores. The objective is mainly to assess the competence of the test takers to effectively accomplish the communication tasks verbally in different language contexts.

=== Writing ===
The TOCFL Writing test is an evaluation of the test-taker's ability to use written materials to effectively transmit information in particular contexts. The level-based grading system is based on the appropriateness and substance of the test-taker's responses to situational tasks, compositional structure and completeness, correct syntax, and the use of a suitably wide range of appropriate vocabulary.

== Overseas testing ==
Aside from being available in Taiwan, SC-TOP has been providing overseas testing services since 2006. However, compared to the HSK exam, the number of test locations is somewhat limited. According to the SC-TOP's official website, the test can be taken in the following countries:

- Asia Pacific — Australia, India, Indonesia, Japan, Korea, Malaysia, Mongolia, Myanmar, New Zealand, the Philippines, Thailand, Turkey, Vietnam
- Central and South America — Argentina, Brazil, Nicaragua, Paraguay, Saint Lucia
- Europe — Austria, Belgium, Czech Republic, France, Germany, Ireland, Poland, Russia, Spain, Slovenia, Sweden, Switzerland, United Kingdom
- Africa - Eswatini, South Africa
- North America — Canada, United States, Mexico

== See also ==
- Hanyu Shuiping Kaoshi (HSK) – the Chinese language test used in mainland China
- ZHC – a Chinese language test intended for native speakers in mainland China
- Test of English as a Foreign Language
- List of language proficiency tests
