= Afaa M. Weaver =

American writer

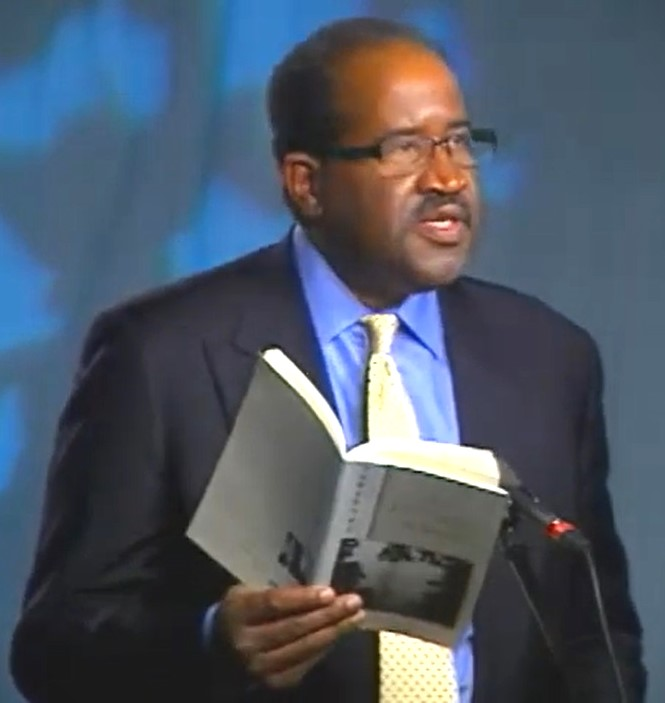
- Weaver reading poetry in 2013
- Born: 1951 (age 74–75); Baltimore, Maryland
- Education: Excelsior University (B.A.); Brown University (M.A.)
- Occupations: Poet; short-story writer; editor

Afaa Michael Weaver (born 1951 in Baltimore, Maryland), formerly known as Michael S. Weaver, is an American poet, short-story writer, and editor. He is the author of numerous poetry collections, and his honors include a Fulbright Scholarship and fellowships from the National Endowment for the Arts, Pew Foundation, and Kingsley Tufts Poetry Award. He served as the Director of the Writing Intensive at The Frost Place.He has received the Wallace Stevens Award and is a Chancellor at the Academy of American Poets https://poets.org/poet/afaa-michael-weaver

== Life ==
Born in Maryland, he studied two years at the University of Maryland. He started 7th Son Press and the literary journal Blind Alleys. He graduated from Brown University on a fellowship, with an M.A, and Excelsior University with a B.A. On October 15, 2019, Afaa and Kristen Skedgell, a memoirist, playwright, and poet, were married in a private ceremony with family and friends.

Afaa's teaching career began with his work as an adjunct first at Essex County Community College, and subsequently in New York City at two branches of CUNY, Borough of Manhattan Community College and Brooklyn College. At New York University he taught the undergraduate workshop in poetry and a survey course in African American Drama. In 1990 He accepted a tenure track position at Rutgers-Camden, where he received tenure with distinction in 1995. In 1997 he became the first Black Poet In Residence at Bucknell University, and accepted a position at Simmons University as the Alumnae Chair in English. In 2002, He taught at National Taiwan University and Taipei National University of the Arts as a Fulbright Scholar, and was a faculty member at the Cave Canem Foundation's annual retreat. In addition, he was the first to be named an elder of the Cave Canem Foundation. He began his formal studies in 2002 at Simmons as a faculty audit, and for his sabbatical year 2004-2005 he moved to Taiwan and continued to study at the Taipei Language Institute in Taiwan. He was Chairman of the Simmons International Chinese Poetry Conference. Tess Onwueme, the Nigerian playwright, gave him the Ibo name "Afaa", meaning "oracle", while Dr. Perng Ching-hsi has given him the Chinese name "Wei Yafeng".

His poems have appeared in literary journals and magazines, including The New Yorker" "African American Literary Review" Callaloo.

== Honors and awards ==
- 2023 Wallace Stevens Award
- 2019 St.Botolph Foundaion Distinguished Artist Award
- 2017 Guggenheim Fellowship in Poetry
- 2014 Kingsley Tufts Poetry Award
- 2002 Fulbright Scholarship
- 1985 National Endowment for the Arts Literature Fellowship
- 1998 Pew Fellowships in the Arts

== Published works ==
Full-length poetry collections

- A Fire in the Hills (Pasadena: Red Hen Press, 2023)
- Spirit Boxing (Pitt Poetry Series, 2017)
- The City of Eternal Spring(Pitt Poetry Series, 2014)
- A Hard Summation (Central Square Press, 2014)
- The Government of Nature (Pitt Poetry Series, 2013)
- The Plum Flower Dance: Poems 1985 to 2005 (University of Pittsburgh Press, 2007)
- Multitudes. Sarabande Books. 2000. ISBN 978-1-889330-41-9.
- The Ten Lights of God. Bucknell University Press. February 2000. ISBN 978-0-8387-5434-4.
- Timber and Prayer: The Indian Pond Poems (University of Pittsburgh Press, 1995)
- My Father's Geography (University of Pittsburgh Press, 1992)
- Water Song. University Press of Virginia. 1985. Callaloo series
- Sandy Point. Engravings Rosalyn Richards. Lewisburg, Pennsylvania: The Press of Appletree Alley.

Plays

- Rosa was produced in 1993 at Venture Theater in Philadelphia
- "Elvira and the Lost Prince"

Anthologies edited

- Afaa Michael Weaver, ed. (2002). These hands I know: African-American writers on family. Sarabande Books. p. 135. ISBN 978-1-889330-72-3. "Afaa M. Weaver."

Anthology publications

- Arnold Rampersad; Hilary Herbold, eds. (2006). "My Father's Geography". The Oxford anthology of African-American poetry. Oxford University Press US. ISBN 978-0-19-512563-4.
- Mona Eliasson, ed. (1999). "Eighteen". Teaching about Violence Against Women. Feminist Press. ISBN 978-1-55861-211-2.
- Gloria Naylor, ed. (1997). Children of the night: the best short stories by Black writers, 1967 to the present. Little, Brown and Co. ISBN 978-0-316-59923-8.
- Maria M. Gillan; Jennifer Gillan, eds. (1999). Identity lessons: contemporary writing about learning to be American. Penguin Books. ISBN 978-0-14-027167-6.

== Sources ==
- Library of Congress Online Catalog > Afaa M. Weaver
