= List of Chinese language schools in Taiwan for foreign students =

Taiwan has long been a destination for foreign learners of Mandarin and is home to many Mandarin language schools. Several schools also offer courses in Hokkien or Taiwanese, or less commonly Hakka and Cantonese. Below is a list of Mandarin language schools in Taiwan:

School name	Institute Name	District	City
National Cheng Kung University	Chinese Language Center		Tainan
National Chiao Tung University	Chinese Language Center	East District	Hsinchu
National Chiayi University	Language Center		Chiayi City
National Chung Hsing University	The Language Center	South District	Taichung
National Dong Hwa University	Chinese Language Center	Shoufeng	Hualien
National Pingtung University of Education	Language Center		Pingtung
National Sun Yat-Sen University	Chinese Language Center	Gushan District	Kaohsiung
National Taichung University of Education	Chinese Language Center	West District, Taichung	Taichung
Taiwan Mandarin Institute	Chinese Language Education Center	Da'an District	Taipei
National Taiwan University	International Chinese Language Program	Da'an District	Taipei
National Taiwan Normal University	Mandarin Training Center	Da'an District	Taipei
Providence University	Chinese Language Education Center	Shalu	Taichung
Tamkang University	Chinese Language Center	Tamsui District	New Taipei
Tunghai University	Chinese Language Center	Xitun District	Taichung
Tzu Chi University	Chinese Language Center	Hualien City	Hualien County
LTL Language School	LTL Taipei	Da'an District	Taipei
Shih Chien University	Chinese Language Center	Zhongshan District	Taipei
Mandarin Daily News Language Center	Chinese Language Center	Zhongzheng District	New Taipei
Chinese Culture University	Mandarin Learning Center	Da'an District	Taipei

== See also ==
- Scholarships in Taiwan
- Huayu Enrichment Scholarship
- List of universities and colleges in Taiwan
- Taiwan Academy
- Taiwan Center for Mandarin Learning
