= Inter-University Program for Chinese Language Study =

Mandarin learning center at Tsinghua University, Beijing, China

The Inter-University Program for Chinese Language Studies at Tsinghua University (Chinese: 清华IUP中文中心) is an advanced Mandarin Chinese study center in Beijing associated with Stanford University. IUP started in Taipei, Taiwan in 1963 and was known as the Stanford Center. In 1997 it moved to Beijing, following Mainland China's Reform and opening, and the original Stanford Center in Taipei was renamed the International Chinese Language Program.

The IUP currently offers a 32-week Academic Year Program, a 16-week Semester Option, and an 8-week Summer Intensive Program. All programs are located on its Tsinghua University campus in Beijing.

Classes sizes are very small: typically a class will involve 50-minutes of Chinese-only instruction with a professor and 2-3 students seated around a small table. A typical course load is 3-5 such classes a day from Monday to Friday, with about 4–6 hours of homework in the evenings.

== See also ==
- Mandarin Chinese
