= List of mainland Chinese schools reopened in Hong Kong =

Mainland Chinese schools reopened in Hong Kong
- Traditional Chinese: 在港復校
- Literal meaning: restoration of the school in Hong Kong
Transcriptions
Yue: Cantonese
- Jyutping: zoi6 gong2 fuk6 haau6

Following the Communist victory at the end of the Chinese Civil War and establishment of the People's Republic of China in 1949, educational institutions from the former Republic of China either relocated to then British-ruled Hong Kong or saw their faculty and staff flee mainland China to escape political repression—such as the 1952 reorganization of higher education in China. These efforts eventually led to the re-establishment of several mainland institutions in Hong Kong.

== List of schools ==
=== Universities ===
- Lingnan University (Founded in Guangzhou, 1888; re-established in Hong Kong, 1967)
- Hong Kong Chu Hai College (Founded in Guangzhou, 1947; re-established as a ROC university in British Hong Kong in 1949; became a Hong Kong college in 2004)

=== High schools ===
- St. Francis Xavier's College, Tai Kok Tsui (founded in Shanghai, 1874; re-established in Hong Kong, 1955)
- Wa Ying College (founded in Foshan, 1913; re-established in Hong Kong, 1971)

=== Seminaries ===
- China Bible Seminary (founded in Shanghai, 1930; re-established in Hong Kong, 1964)

== See also ==
- List of mainland Chinese schools reopened in Taiwan
- New Asia College (founded in 1949), Chung Chi College (founded in 1951) and United College of Hong Kong (founded in 1956), tertiary institutions established by scholars who fled to Hong Kong during the Chinese Civil War, and later became the three founding member colleges of The Chinese University of Hong Kong (founded in 1963).
