= List of mainland Chinese schools reopened in Taiwan =

Mainland Chinese schools reopened in Taiwan (Chinese: 在臺復校; Wade–Giles: tsai^{4}-tʻai^{2}-fu^{4}-hsiao^{4}; lit. 'restoration of the school in Taiwan') refer to the re-establishment of pre-1949 mainland Chinese schools in Taiwan after 1949. These included schools from middle schools to universities.

== List of schools ==
=== Military and police academies ===
- Republic of China Naval Academy (Shanghai, 1866 → Kaohsiung, 1949)
- Republic of China Air Force Academy (Hangzhou, 1929 → Kaohsiung, 1949)
- National Defense Medical Center (Shanghai, 1902 → Taipei, 1949)
- Republic of China Military Academy (Guangzhou, 1924 → Kaohsiung, 1950)
- Central Police University (Nanjing, 1936 → Taoyuan, 1954)

=== Universities ===
- Chien Hsin University of Science and Technology (Shanghai, 1933 → Taoyuan, 1953)
- Soochow University (Suzhou, 1900 → Taipei, 1954)
- National Chengchi University (Nanjing, 1927 → Taipei, 1954)
- Providence University (Kaifeng, 1932 → Taichung, 1956)
- National Tsing Hua University (Beiping, 1911 → Hsinchu, 1956)
- National Chiao Tung University (Shanghai, 1896 → Hsinchu, 1958)
- Fu Jen Catholic University (Beiping, 1925 → Taipei, 1961)
- National Central University (Nanjing, 1915 → Taoyuan, 1962)
- St. John's University (Shanghai, 1905 → New Taipei, 1967)
- National Sun Yat-sen University (Guangzhou, 1904 → Kaohsiung, 1980；current sources denied "reopen")
- National Chi Nan University (Nanjing, 1906 → Puli, 1995；official history now denied "reopen", but claim held by alumnus in Hong Kong)

== See also ==
- Famous four universities in republican China
- List of universities in Taiwan
- List of mainland Chinese schools reopened in Hong Kong
- Free University of Berlin – with American support, it was founded as the de facto Western continuation of the University of Berlin, which had reopened in 1946 in the Soviet sector of Berlin
- Soongsil University – established in Pyongyang (1897; now North Korea) but relocated to Seoul, South Korea (1954) after the Korean War
