= Tad Waddington =

American businessman

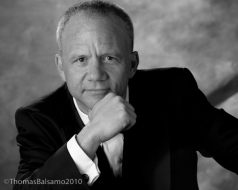
- Tad Waddington in 2011
- Education: Arizona State University; University of Chicago
- Occupation: Businessman

Tad Waddington is an American businessman.

== Early life and education ==
Waddington received his BA in Psychology and Chinese from Arizona State University where he graduated summa cum laude with a 4.0 GPA; and was inducted into the academic honor society Phi Beta Kappa Society, and won the Moeur award, ASU's highest academic honor. He also studied at the Beijing Foreign Language Institute and the International Chinese Language Program. He received an MA from the University of Chicago's Divinity School in 1990 and a PhD from the Department of Education's Measurement, Evaluation, and Statistical Analysis program at the University of Chicago under Larry Hedges. He is also a graduate of the University of Chicago|University of Chicago's Booth School of Business' Chicago Management Institute.

== Business works ==
=== Positions ===
Waddington was with Accenture from 1997 to 2012. He was a Gallup Organization Research Director. As a writer at English Digest (Taipei, Taiwan), he published over 300 articles. Waddington co-authored Return on Learning: Training for High Performance at Accenture (Agate, 2007). Waddington performed an in-depth statistical analysis of detailed records on the 261,000 people who have ever worked for the company. These records include information such as cost rates, bill rates, total time with the organization, and promotion date.

Waddington is the author of Lasting Contribution: How to Think, Plan, and Act to Accomplish Meaningful Work. This self-help business book was published by Agate in 2008.

Kirkus Reviews described Lasting Contribution as:

A self-help guide that assembles scholarly and scientific material to illustrate why things happen, why people act and how those people can plan actions that make a difference. Unlike the average motivational guru who seems to have read a single book-the one he or she has just written-Waddington has read them all, so readers will learn what ancient thinkers, religious leaders, modern scientists and rival motivational guides teach about human behavior.... This thin volume contains wisdom, scientific facts and insights from great figures, all in the service of planning a meaningful future. A thought-provoking work that bears rereading.
