= Scholarships in Taiwan =

Scholarships offered for students and researchers

The scholarships in Taiwan include scholarships for pursuing degrees (bachelor, master or PhD), academic exchange, conducting research, learning Mandarin and experiencing culture in Taiwan. They are mostly funded by the Taiwanese government, universities and Academia Sinica, but also by non-profit foundations.

== Overview ==
The Taiwan Fellowships & Scholarships (TAFS) program is a joint governmental initiative (Ministry of Science and Technology, Ministry of Foreign Affairs (MOFA), Ministry of Education (MOE), Ministry of Culture and Ministry of Economic Affairs) aimed to promote exchange and friendships between Taiwan and the global community. The TAFS comprises awards in three categories: scholarships for Degree, fellowships for research and Huayu (Mandarin) Enrichment Scholarships. Approximately 1,250 TAFS grants are provided annually for undergraduate and postgraduate students as well as researchers across the world to study or to conduct advanced research in Taiwan.

== Bachelor and master degrees ==
Program	Financial assistance	Additional benefits	Maximum duration	Eligibility
MOFA Taiwan Scholarship	NT$25,000/month during LEP, NT$30,000/month during degree program	one-year Mandarin Language Enrichment Program (LEP)	four years (bachelor), two years (master)	countries with diplomatic ties with Taiwan or countries designated by MOFA
MOE Taiwan Scholarship	NT$15,000/month (bachelor), NT$20,000/month (master)	waiver of tuition fees	four years (bachelor), two years (master)	non-Taiwanese nationals
NTU Scholarship	NT$250,000/year		two years	non-Taiwanese students at National Taiwan University

== PhD degrees ==
=== Taiwan International Graduate Program ===
Taiwan International Graduate Program (TIGP) is an English-language PhD program at Academia Sinica, Taiwan's foremost research institute for life sciences, physical sciences, humanities and social sciences. In the year 2016, there were 57 TIGP graduates and as of December, 2016, 537 students from 44 countries were enrolled in TIGP

=== Taiwan Scholarship ===
In addition to bachelor's and master's degrees, the MOFA and MOE Taiwan Scholarships from the Taiwanese government are also available for PhD programs.

=== University scholarships ===
Some universities provide their own scholarships for international students.

Program	Financial assistance	Additional benefits	Maximum duration	Eligibility
Taiwan International Graduate Program	NT$34,000/month	two-semester basic Mandarin course	four years, further financial support depends on PhD supervisors	Taiwanese and non-Taiwanese nationals
Academia Sinica Scholarship	up to NT$34,000/month before PhD qualification exam, up to NT$40,000/month after PhD qualification exam (i.e., PhD candidates)			Taiwanese and non-Taiwanese nationals
MOFA Taiwan Scholarship	NT$25,000/month during LEP, NT$30,000/month during degree program	one-year Mandarin Language Enrichment Program (LEP)	four years	countries with diplomatic ties with Taiwan or countries designated by MOFA
MOE Taiwan Scholarship	NT$20,000/month	waiver of tuition fees	four years	non-Taiwanese nationals
NTU Scholarship	NT$500,000/year		three years	non-Taiwanese students at National Taiwan University

== Short-term exchange ==
Fellowships are available for researchers from all fields. Some, however, are limited to only Taiwan studies and sinology. The TIGP International Internship Program is available for two-month research stay in Academia Sinica.

Program	Financial assistance	Additional benefits	Duration	Eligibility
TIGP International Internship Program	NT$30,000/month	round-trip flight ticket, basic Mandarin course	two months	pre-doctoral, non-Taiwanese nationals
Short Term Research Award	NT$25,000/month for PhD students, NT$40,000/month for postdocs	round-trip flight ticket	two to six months	non-Taiwanese nationals
MOE APEC Scholarship	NT$25,000/month for PhD students, NT$40,000/month for postdocs	round-trip flight ticket	two to six months	from APEC member states
Taiwan Summer Institute Program (MOST and DAAD)	€900/month	round-trip flight ticket, insurances	two months	Students (natural sciences or engineering) in Germany that have a bachelor's degree

== Learning Mandarin ==
Huayu Enrichment Scholarship is provided on a competitive basis to foreigners who want to learn the Mandarin language in one of the Mandarin study centers in Taiwan such as the Mandarin Training Center.

Program	Financial assistance	Additional benefits	Maximum duration	Eligibility
MOE Huayu Enrichment Scholarship	NT$25,000/month		2, 3, 6, 9 or 12 months	non-Taiwanese nationals

In 2021, the Hanyu BEST Program is provided for top selected Mandarin study centers in Taiwan to establish oversea Mandarin centers with partner university such as Chinese Language Center (CLC) of National Dong Hwa University (NDHU), which established Mandarin centers in Howard University and Oakland University.

== See also ==
- Huayu Enrichment Scholarship
- Taiwan Scholarship
- Academia Sinica#Education programs
