= Famous four universities in republican China =

The Famous Four Universities in Republican China (simplified Chinese: 民国四大名校; traditional Chinese: 民國四大名校; pinyin: Mínguó sì dà míngxiào) from 1912 to 1949 were four universities that moved inland to avoid the war damages while still managing to keep the schools running during Second Sino-Japanese War, namely National Central University (now primarily Nanjing University), National Wuhan University, National Zhejiang University, and National Southwestern Associated University (including National Peking University, National Tsinghua University, and Private Nankai University).

== History ==
The original term was Famous Five Universities in Republican China. In 1937, five of China's top national universities, National Central University, National Peking University, National Tsing Hua University, National Zhejiang University, and National Wuhan University, conducted a unified admissions examination across the country, referred to as the "Five Famous Universities Joint Entrance Examination".

In July and August, examination papers from all over the country are reviewed on the campus of Nanjing Central University. From time to time, Japanese planes bombed Nanjing, and the marking work was greatly harassed. In particular, the personal safety of professors involved in grading work was at risk. Luo Jialun, president of National Central University, Zhu Kezhen, president of National Zhejiang University, and Zeng Zhaoan of National Wuhan University, who were responsible for organizing the review of the examination papers, arranged for the professors who had completed the examination to leave Nanjing as soon as possible.

In the face of the national crisis, National Peking University, National Tsinghua University and Private Nankai University merged to form National Southwestern Associated University, which eventually moved to Kunming, Yunnan, National Central University to Chongqing, National Zhejiang University to Zunyi, Guizhou, and National Wuhan University to Leshan, Sichuan. These four universities were then termed as Famous Four Universities in Republican China.

After the war, University of Oxford acknowledged their effort and excellence by granting students of these universities, together with Peking Union Medical College, the status of seniors when they meet certain standards.

In September 1947, Hu Shih, then president of National Peking University, published the "Ten-Year Plan for China's Academic Independence." He believed that in the first five years, National Peking University, National Tsinghua University, National Zhejiang University, National Wuhan University, and National Central University should be prioritized. “These five universities already had a foundation before the war, as long as we concentrate on the economic strength and enrich them in advance, they would surely become world-famous universities." Hu Shi made this suggestion directly to Chiang Kai-shek, then Chairman of the National Government.

After the establishment of the People's Republic of China in 1949, these universities were renamed and went through the 1952 reorganization of higher education in China. National Central University and National Tsing Hua University were rebuilt in Taiwan.

== List ==
Famous Universities in Republican China
| University | Location | Type | Successors |
|---|---|---|---|
| National Central University 國立中央大學 | Nanjing | National | Nanjing University, National Central University |
| National Wuhan University 國立武漢大學 | Wuhan | National | Wuhan University |
| National Zhejiang University 國立浙江大學 | Hangzhou | National | Zhejiang University |
| National Southwestern Associated University 國立西南聯合大學 | Kunming | National | Peking University; Tsinghua University, National Tsing Hua University; Nankai University |
| National Peking University 國立北京大學 | Beijing | National | Peking University |
| National Tsinghua University 國立清華大學 | Beijing | National | Tsinghua University, National Tsing Hua University |
| Private Nankai University 私立南開大學 | Tianjin | Private | Nankai University |

== See also ==
- C9 League
- Higher education in China
- History of education in China
- List of mainland Chinese schools reopened in Taiwan
- List of universities and colleges in Taiwan
