= Mandarin Training Center =

School of National Taiwan Normal University

Coordinates: 25°1′38.46″N 121°31′42.68″E

- 國語教學中心
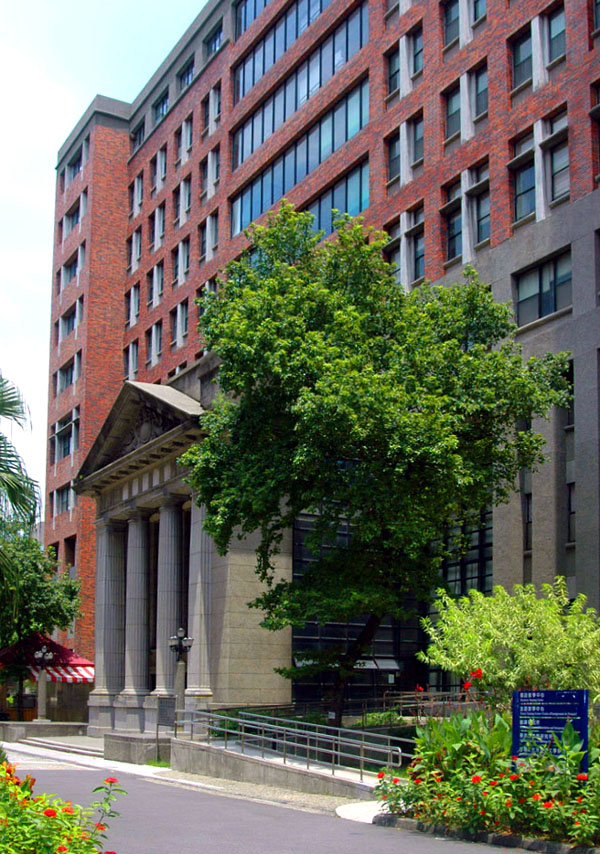
- MTC occupies five floors of the Language Studies Building
- Former names: Center for Chinese Language and Culture Studies (2002–2004)
- Type: Institute
- Established: 1956
- Affiliation: National Taiwan Normal University
- Academic staff: 150
- Students: approx. 1000
- Location: Daan, Taipei, Taiwan
- Website: mtc.ntnu.edu.tw/eng/

The Mandarin Training Center (MTC; Chinese: 國語教學中心) is a language institute in Taipei, Taiwan, affiliated with National Taiwan Normal University (NTNU). It was established in 1956 and is a Chinese as a second language institution. MTC is the oldest and largest facility of its kind in terms of courses offered and students enrolled per year.

== History ==
MTC was founded in 1956. It was briefly known as the Center for Chinese Language and Culture Studies from 2002 to 2004. There are courses in Chinese calligraphy, Chinese martial arts, and traditional music and theater. Courses are offered in three-month quarterly terms throughout the year. This system enables international students to engage in intensive language study during their summer breaks and within single semesters. The MTC sponsors travel, hosts speech contests, and stages workshops and performances.

In September 2016, NTNU and the Ministry of Education launched the Office of Global Mandarin Education at the university.

== Enrollment ==
Over 1000 students from over 70 countries enroll for studies each year at the Mandarin Training Center. Since 8 April 2013, people unable to attend MTC have had MTC Online as an option. The center's alumni association, the MTCAA, has been in existence since 1998.

== Notable alumni ==
- Ákos Bertalan Apatóczky - Hungarian sinologist
- Richard Bernstein - American journalist
- March Fong Eu - American politician
- Andrew Fastow - former CFO of Enron
- Howard Goldblatt - American literary translator
- Imre Hamar - Hungarian scholar of Chinese studies
- Ryutaro Hashimoto - former Prime Minister of Japan
- Jon Huntsman, Jr. - former United States Ambassador to Singapore from 1992 to 1993, and China from 2009 to 2011
- Koichi Kato - former government minister of Japan
- Pierre Ryckmans - Belgian-Australian writer, essayist and sinologist
- Kevin Rudd - former Prime Minister of Australia
- Chie Tanaka - Japanese model and actress
- Richard Vuylsteke - President of the American Chamber of Commerce in Hong Kong
- Stephen H. West - American sinologist
- Pierre Marsone - French sinologist

== See also ==
- International Chinese Language Program (ICLP) at the National Taiwan University
- Chinese Language Center (CLC) of National Dong Hwa University (NDHU)
- Mandarin Learning Center (MLC) at Chinese Culture University
- List of Chinese language schools in Taiwan
- Chinese as a second language
- Huayu Enrichment Scholarship
