= White Deer Grotto Academy =

Former school in Jiangxi, China

Coordinates: 29°40′18″N 115°59′21″E

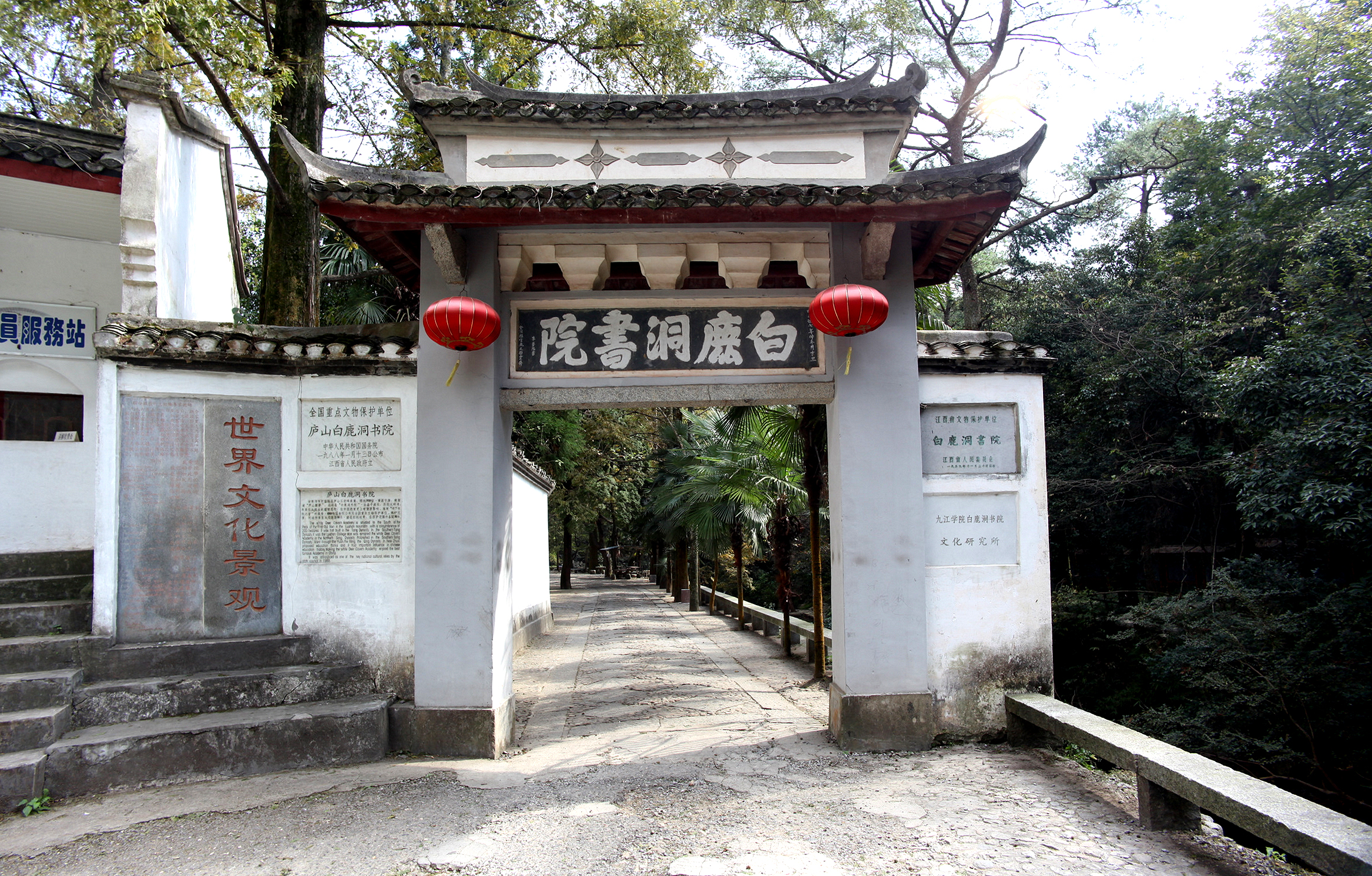
Mount Lu White Lotus Grotto Academy

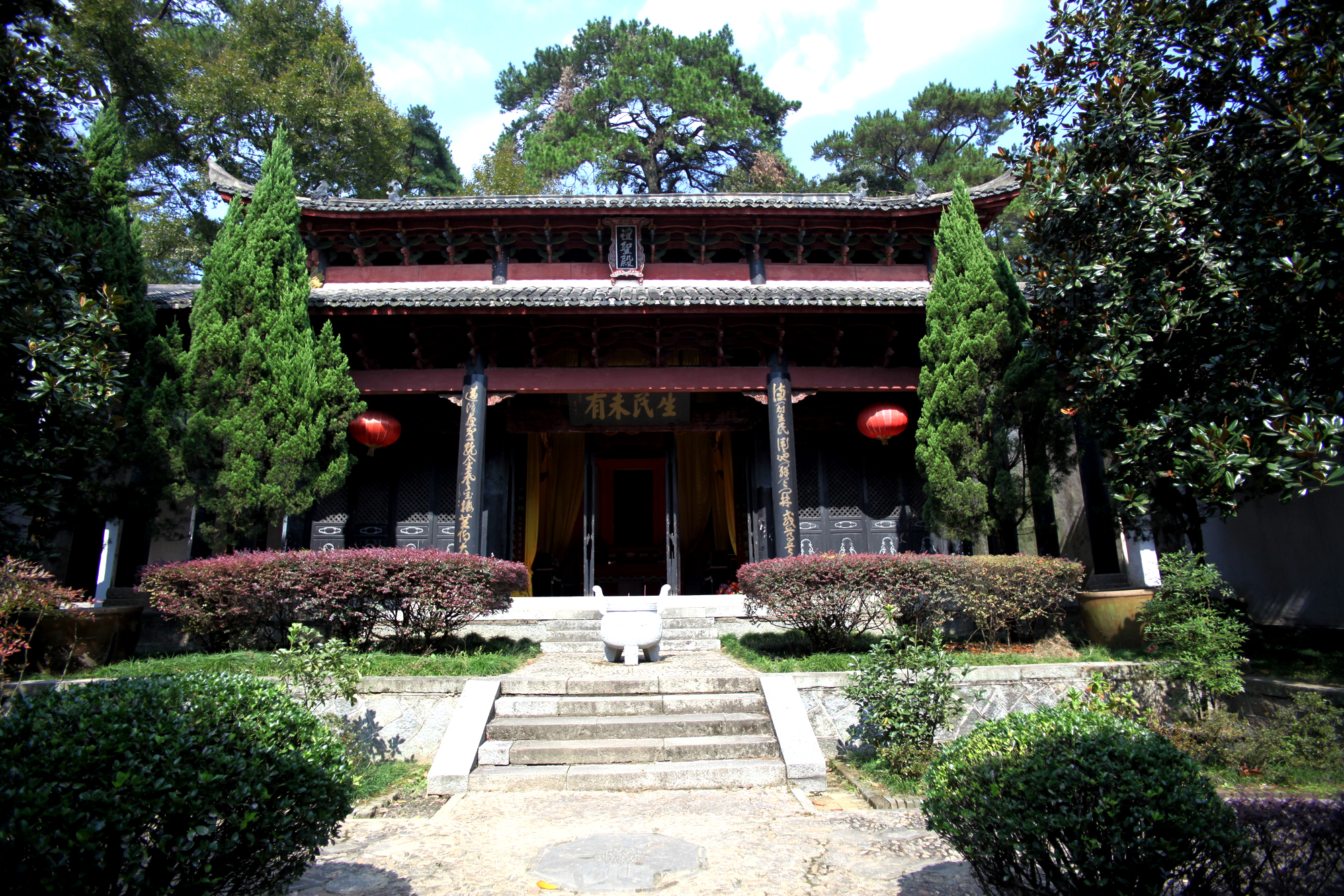
The Lisheng Hall (礼圣殿) at White Deer Grotto Academy

The White Deer Grotto Academy (Chinese: 白鹿洞書院; pinyin: Báilùdòng Shūyuàn, Gan: Pak-Luk-Tung Su-yon, sometimes translated as White Deer Cave Academy or White Deer Hollow Academy) is a former school at the foot of Wulou Peak in Mount Lu, now in Jiujiang. It was one of the Four Great Academies of China, and today it is maintained as an important landmark.

== History ==
The academy had its beginnings as a place for the pursuit of learning by the Tang dynasty poet Li Bo (李渤 Lǐ Bó, d. 831, not to be confused with the more famous Tang poet Li Po (李白) or Li Bai) when he was living in retirement. As Li Bo kept a white deer, he was known as the White Deer Teacher and the school premises themselves as the White Deer Grotto. In the years 937–942, when the area was under the control of the Southern Tang, a school was officially established here under the name "Lushan Guoxue" or "Lu-san Goet-hok" (廬山國學, meaning "Mount Lu National Institute"), by Li Shandao.

In the early years of the Northern Song dynasty, which began in 960, the Lushan Guoxue was transformed into an academy known as the White Deer Grotto Academy. The academy was the recipient of imperial favour from the Emperor Taizong (r. 976–997), who bestowed on it books and awarded official rank to the academy's head. However, it later fell into disrepair.

In 1179–80, during the Southern Song dynasty, the academy was rebuilt and expanded by Zhu Xi, later to become the most preeminent of the neo-Confucianists. Zhu Xi, who was serving as prefect of Nankang Prefecture (now Nankang City), rebuilt the academy based on the layout of the Temple of Confucius at Qufu. The new academy opened its doors to students and scholars in 1180. It was involved in instruction, the collection and preservation of books, religious sacrifices, the development of curricula, and lectures by famous scholars, including such notable names as Lu Jiuyuan, Lü Zuqian, and later Wang Yangming. The academy continued to flourish for eight centuries. The rules of the academy as set down by Zhu Xi had a profound and lasting influence on the subsequent development of Confucianism.

== Image gallery ==
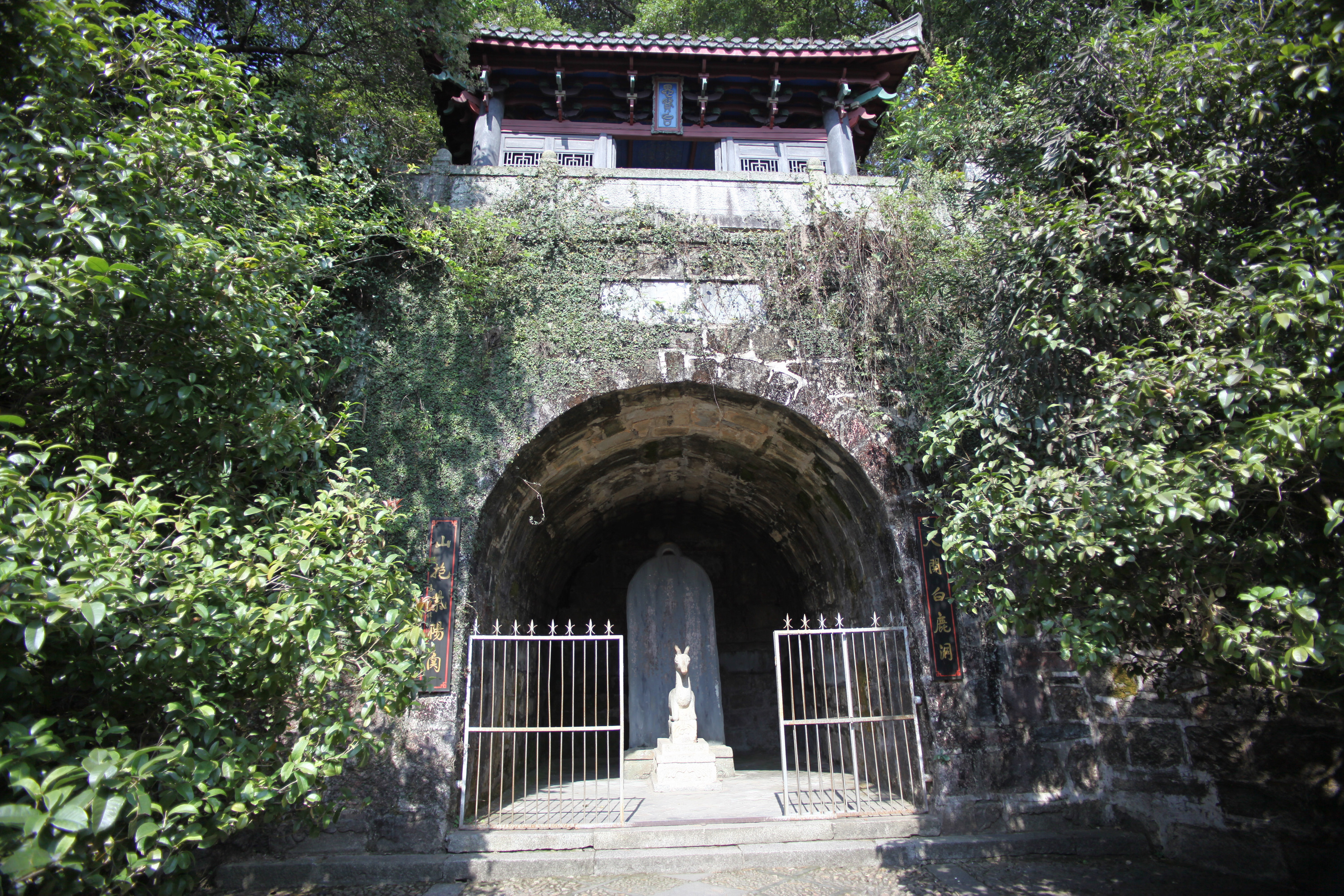
White Deer Grotto

Zhu Xi bronze statue at the White Deer Grotto Academy in Mount Lu

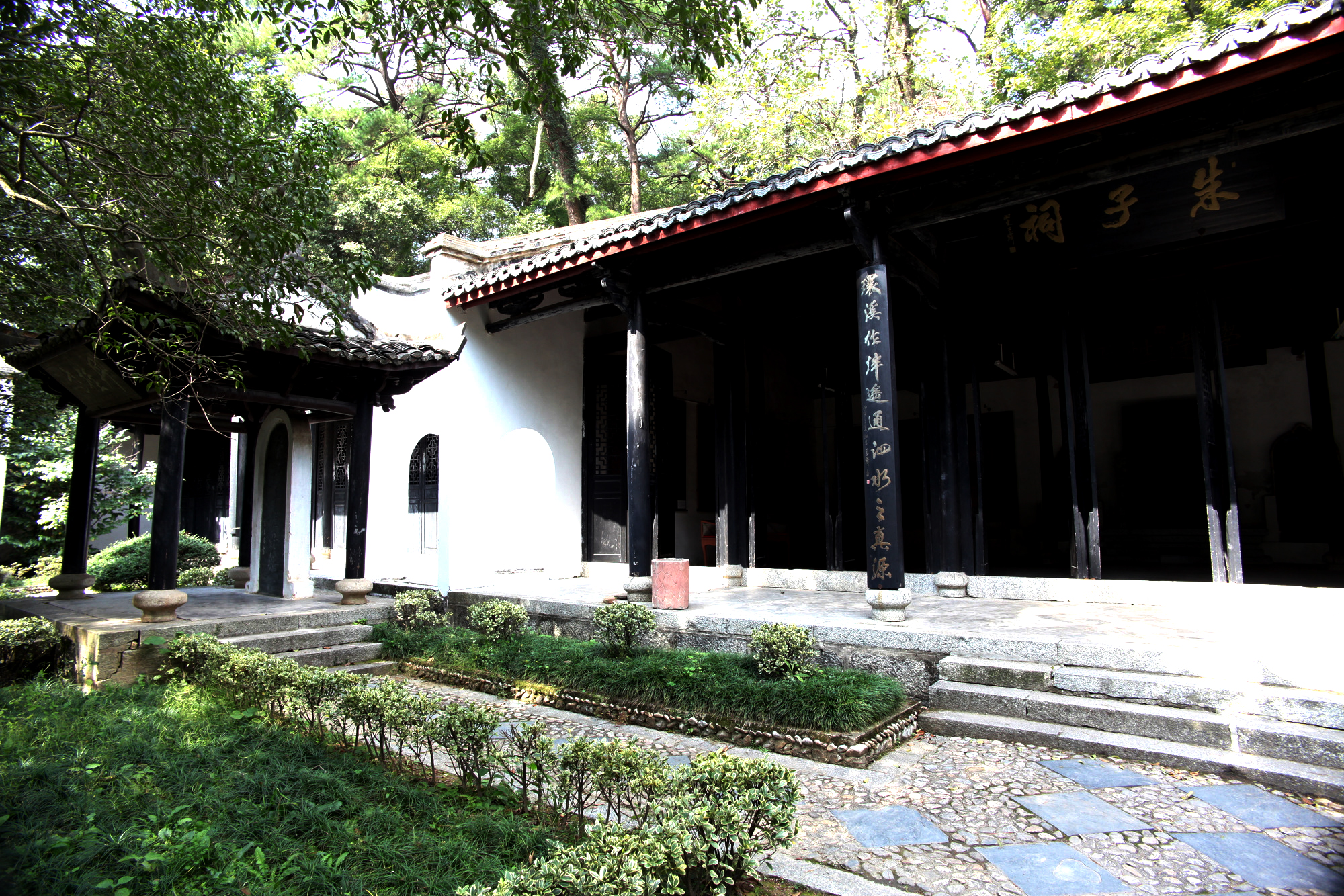
Zhu Xi temple in White Deer Grotto Academy

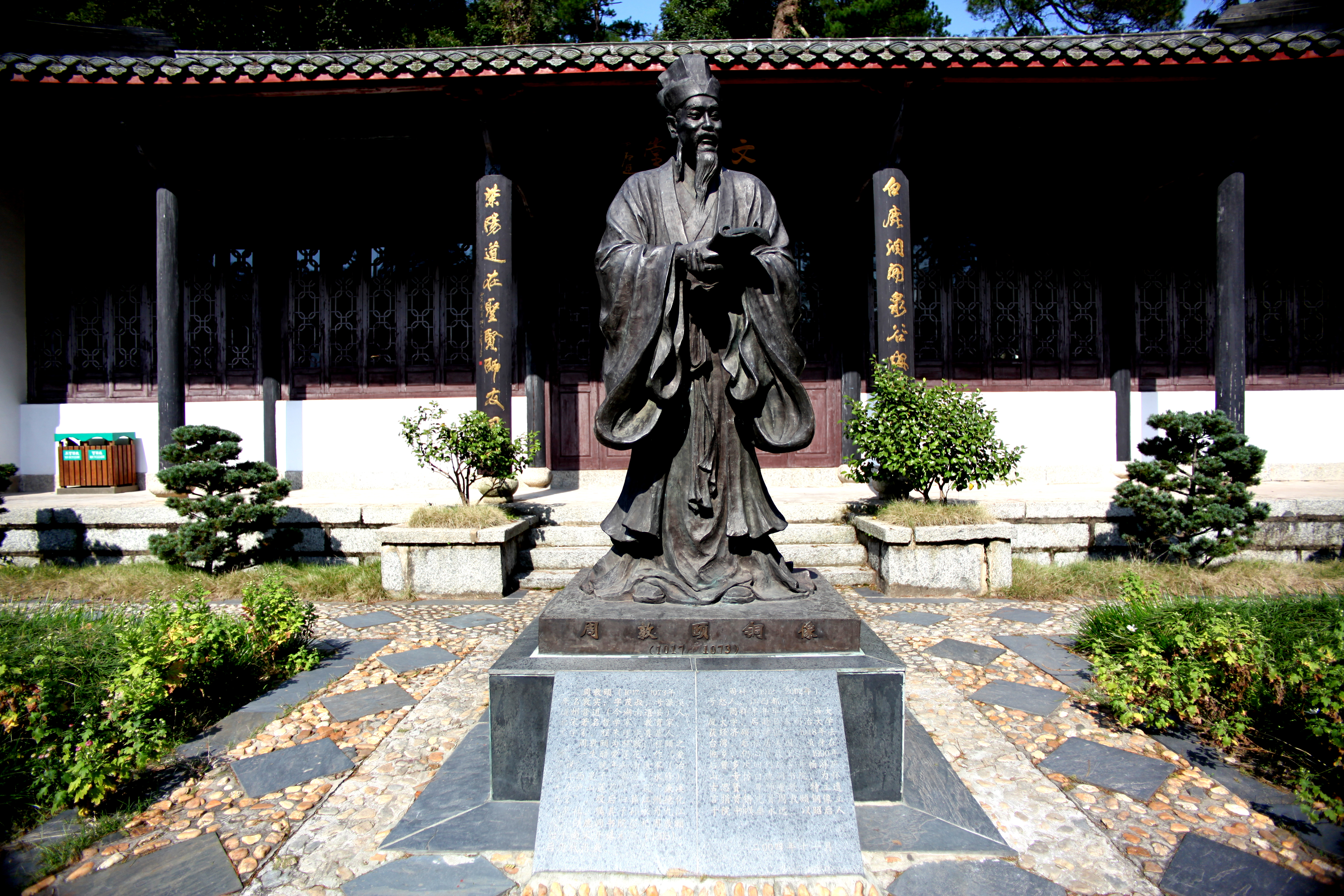
Bronze statue of Zhou Dunyi in White Deer Grotto Academy
