= Voluntary Optimisation of Class Structure Scheme =

Voluntary Optimisation of Class Structure Scheme is a scheme launched by the Education Bureau (EDB) of Hong Kong to facilitate the implementation of the new senior secondary curriculum. It is launched by the department on 25 March 2010.

== Background ==
The Education Bureau announced on 25 March 2010 that secondary schools would be invited to optimise their class structure through a voluntary class-size reduction scheme.

It invited schools operating five or more Secondary One (S1) classes to consider optimising their class structure by means of class reduction on a voluntary basis. The arrangement for class reduction starts from S1 and extends to other levels progressively year by year.

=== Original Scheme Measures ===
According to the Scheme, schools are allowed to keep their incumbent teachers on the approved teaching staff establishment in the school year preceding the commencement of S1 class reduction for five years, so that the schools concerned can better plan to adjust their staff strength through natural wastage and other means. During the five-year toleration period of surplus teachers, on top of the entitled Senior Secondary Curriculum Support Grant (SSCSG) that these schools will continue to receive, they are also provided with an additional cash provision (extra SSCSG) in the amount of $0.25 million per annum for appointing teachers, teaching assistants and / or procuring services to enhance the quality of education.

The measures later on have been enhanced. The enhanced measures for the Voluntary Optimisation of Class Structure Scheme were proposed in November 2010.

To facilitate sustainable development of secondary schools under the New Senior Secondary (NSS) academic structure, the Education Bureau (EDB) invited schools operating five or more Secondary One (S1) classes to consider optimising their class structure by means of class reduction on a voluntary basis in March this year. The arrangement for class reduction starts from S1 and extends to other levels progressively year by year.

== Enhanced Measures ==
In 2010, the EDB provided enhanced measures to encourage more schools to join the scheme.

== Targeted Schools ==
Participation is entirely voluntary. All the government schools which are run by the government, also subsidized schools, the most common one run by charitable and religious organisations with government funding, can also participate in the scheme.

== Participants ==
After the application deadline (25 February 2011), there were a total of 202 schools have submitted their applications to join the scheme.

== Timeline ==
=== March 25, 2010 ===
Announcement of the first phase of Voluntary Optimization of Class Structure Scheme encourage secondary schools with more than five classes at Secondary 1 level to reduce by one class.

=== October 16, 2010 ===
Announcement of postponing the deadline of application for the Voluntary Optimization of Class Structure Scheme from the end of November 2010 to the end of February 2011.

=== April 11, 2010 ===
Seven secondary schools in Tai Po agree to join the Voluntary Optimization of Class Structure Scheme together. Also known as 大埔率先全區減班避殺校

=== January 12, 2011 ===
14 secondary schools in Northern District declared to join the Voluntary Optimization of Class Structure Scheme

=== February 2, 2011 ===
19 secondary schools in Tuen Mun District declare to join the Voluntary Optimization of Class Structure Scheme

=== February 25, 2011 ===
King's College (Hong Kong) joined the Voluntary Optimization of Class Structure Scheme

=== March 30, 2011 ===
Wah Yan College, Kowloon declared to withdraw from the Voluntary Optimization of Class Structure Scheme which the school had once decided to join at the beginning.
