= Huang Benli =

Chinese scientist

- 黄本立
- Born: 21 September 1925; British Hong Kong
- Died: 29 June 2025 (aged 99); Xiamen, Fujian, China
- Education: Lingnan University
- Scientific career
- Fields: Spectrochemistry
- Workplaces: Changchun Institute of Applied Chemistry, Chinese Academy of Sciences; Xiamen University

Chinese name
- Simplified Chinese: 黄本立
- Traditional Chinese: 黃本立
Transcriptions
Standard Mandarin
- Hanyu Pinyin: Huáng Běnlì

Huang Benli (Chinese: 黄本立; 21 September 1925 – 29 June 2025) was a Chinese spectral chemist who was a professor at Xiamen University, and an academician of the Chinese Academy of Sciences. He was a member of the Chinese Democratic League.

== Biography ==
Huang was born in British Hong Kong, on 21 September 1925, while his ancestral home is in Xinhui County (now Xinhui, Jiangmen), Guangdong. In 1945, he was accepted to the Lingnan University，where he majored in the Physics Department.

After University in 1950, Huang was assigned to the Changchun Northeast Science Research Institute (now Changchun Institute of Applied Chemistry, Chinese Academy of Sciences), where he successively worked as technician in 1950, assistant researcher in 1956, deputy researcher in 1978, and researcher in 1982. In 1986, he was recruited as a professor at Xiamen University.

On 29 June 2025, Huang died in Xiamen, Fujian, at the age of 99.

== Honours and awards ==
- 1985 State Science and Technology Progress Award (Third Class) for the Research on Environmental Pollution Analysis Methods and Development of Standard Samples
- November 1993 Member of the Chinese Academy of Sciences (CAS)
