= Mandarin Learning Center =

School of Taipei's Chinese Culture University

- 華語中心
- Established: 1992
- Affiliation: Chinese Culture University
- Students: approx. 1000
- Location: Daan, Taipei, Taiwan
- Website: mlc.sce.pccu.edu.tw/default.aspx

The Chinese Culture University Mandarin Learning Center (CCU MLC; Chinese: 中國文化大學華語中心) is a sub-division of Chinese Culture University, the largest institute of continuing education in Taiwan. The MLC is one of several satellite campuses of Chinese Culture University, located in the Daan District of Taipei City, with an enrollment of over 1000 foreign students in its Mandarin training program every year.

== Background ==
Founded in 1992, SCE’s Mandarin Learning Center has earned a reputation for being a top-notch Mandarin-offering institution. The Mandarin Learning Center of the Chinese Culture University offers practical Mandarin courses to international students, with new courses starting every month, allowing for flexibility in scheduling. Courses are constantly updated, and are designed by language professionals so as to create an active interest for beginner to advanced levels, from children to adult learners, to working professionals and those interested in seeking a career in Teaching Chinese as a second language (TCSL).

The Mandarin Learning Center is known primarily for its teachers, cheaper tuition fees, flexible class starting dates, and newer facilities.

== Location ==
MLC is located at the corner of the Heping East Rd Sec 2 and Jianguo South Rd Sec 2 Intersection, running adjacent to Daan Forest Park.

== Transportation ==
The Mandarin Learning Center is accessible via Guting MRT station (Green line), Taipower Building Station (Green line), or the Technology Building MRT station (Brown line), within an estimated 15–20 minutes walking distance.

By Bus: Numbers 15, 74, 235, 284, Heping Main Line - at the Andong Market stop

== Facilities ==
A Digital Learning Center with computer lab, library, study area, movie viewing room, conferencing rooms located in B4 of the center, and a print and copy shop, and cafe on the first floor. Free WiFi is also available.

== Curriculum ==
Courses are taught using both Zhuyin Fuhao and Hanyu Pinyin phonetic systems. Students may request a teacher with particular bilingual skills (Chinese-English, Chinese-Japanese, Chinese-Korean). Currently, 3 hours a day, 15 hours a week, Monday–Friday is the standard requisite for group classes in addition to an hour long weekly TOP (Test of Proficiency-Huayu) practice exam.

Most recently MLC has also begun to expand its course curriculum by offering Taiwan's premier classes for HSK preparation (Hanyu Shuiping Kaoshi).

Both long-term and short-term study programs are available.

== Course Teaching Materials ==
Regular classes have traditionally used the same textbooks as those used at National Taiwan Normal University's Mandarin Training Center. However, under new administration and direction, the Mandarin Learning Center has recently begun to offer a multitude of new courses covering such topics such as Chinese movies, Chinese songs, Travel, Hanyu Shuiping Kaoshi test preparation, etc.

== Scholarships ==
Currently MLC does not offer its own scholarships to students. Previously, students could take a bi-annually held exam to qualify for a 6-month NT$10,000 per month scholarship. However, students may still apply for government scholarships.

== Volunteer Services ==
MLC offers an office volunteer service for its students. Students who are not comfortable communicating in Chinese may come to the office to speak directly with a volunteer in their own language. Support is available for English, Japanese, Korean, and Vietnamese.
