= Culai Academy =

Culai Academy or Culai Academy of Classical Learning (徂徕书院 cúlái shūyuàn) was built by the Northern Song scholar Shi Jie during the time of his mourning (1038–40). Beside the academy was the "Duyi-tang" (读易堂 dúyì-táng, "Hall for Reading the Yi"), where Shi Jie, Sun Fu, and Shi Jie's disciple Jiang Qian studied the Zuo Zhuan to the Spring and Autumn Annals and the Book of Changes.

It has been classed as one of the Four Great Academies of the Early Song.

The academy was located on the north side of Mt Culai, currently Tai'an City, Shandong province. The place is now called Shufang (書坊), meaning "library".
