= Chinese Language Center =

Chinese language school in Hualien, Taiwan

Coordinates: 23°53′38.1″N 121°32′31.2″E

National Dong Hwa University Chinese Language Center 國立東華大學華語文中心
- Latin: Universitas Nationalis Donghwa; Lingua Sinica Centre
- Parent institution: National Dong Hwa University
- Focus: Mandarin language instruction
- Chair: Distinguished Professor Li Jenq-Fen (李正芬)
- Location: Shoufeng, Hualien, Taiwan
- Website: 國立東華大學華語文中心; NDHU Chinese Language Center

National Dong Hwa University Chinese Language Center (NDHU-CLC; Chinese: 國立東華大學華語文中心) is one of Taiwan's most distinguished Chinese language schools for Chinese as a second language study, run by National Dong Hwa University (NDHU) in Hualien, Taiwan. In 2019, NDHU CLC's students achieved 100% pass rate in TOCFL. In 2021, NDHU CLC founded two oversea Chinese language school at universities in the United States.

== Taiwan Huayu BEST Program ==
NDHU CLC was selected as Taiwan's Best 10 Mandarin Centers in Taiwan Huayu BEST Program by Ministry of Education (MOE), jointly promoting Taiwan's Mandarin education in the United States, Europe, and Australia. With Huayu BEST Program, NDHU CLC received 92.58% expenses support from Taiwan Government and ran two oversea Mandarin Language Centers at Howard University and Oakland University in the United States to bring high-quality Mandarin education to the partner universities.

== Taiwan-Europe Connectivity Scholarships ==
NDHU was selected as nine University in Taiwan-Europe Connectivity Scholarship programme, which is set up by Ministry of Foreign Affairs (MOFA) to encouraging Taiwanese and European universities to establish or expand academic cooperation via school-to-school partnerships. It aimd to attract students from Europe to study Mandarin in Taiwan and engage in exchanges with Taiwanese students.

In 2021, NDHU CLC has a first batch of fifteen European students in the program, which are from universities such as London School of Economics, University of Edinburgh, SOAS University of London, Free University of Berlin, University of Oldenburg, University of Giessen and from United Kingdom, Germany, Poland, Spain.

== Degree Program ==
NDHU CLC jointly offers two programs with NDHU College of Humanities and Social Sciences– MA in Teaching Chinese and Calligraphy (TCLC) and PhD in Teaching Chinese as Second Language (TCSL).

== See also ==
- List of Chinese language schools in Taiwan
- Chinese as a second language
- Huayu Enrichment Scholarship
