= Heung Shing =

Fictional city in Hong Kong examinations

Heung Shing (Chinese: 香城) is a fictional city appearing in Hong Kong examinations. It has appeared on the Hong Kong Certificate of Education Examination, the Hong Kong Advanced Level Examination and the Hong Kong Diploma of Secondary Education Examination administered by the Hong Kong Examinations and Assessment Authority. The city often portrays Hong Kong, though it is unclear whether there are any relations between portrayals in each year's exam papers.

== History ==
Heung Shing is a fictional metropolis that frequently appears in examinations administered by the Hong Kong Examinations and Assessment Authority (HKEAA). The Hong Kong Certificate of Education Examination (HKCEE) used the fictional city on the Chinese language and culture exam, while the Hong Kong Diploma of Secondary Education (HKDSE) uses the city in the Chinese language exam. Beginning in the general examination era, exams every year have used the fictional city.

According to HK01's Chan Ming-chi, Heung Shing is Hong Kong in a "parallel universe" and seems like it comes from a dystopian novel. Chan said that the HKEAA did not confirm whether it is the same city being discussed from year to year. Every year, exams use Heung Shing to discuss various social issues. Using context awareness and arguing their opinions, students have to make recommendations about how to address those problems.

During the 2010 Chinese New Year, a man sold file folders bearing the name "Heung Shing Examinations and Assessment Authority" in parody of "Hong Kong Examinations and Assessment Authority". Calling it copyright infringement, the HKEAA demanded he stop selling them.

In 2013, satirists released a spoof examination from the fictional Heung Shing Propaganda and Brainwashing Bureau (香城宣傳及洗腦局). The Oriental Daily said the test paper's layout was "extremely realistic". The spoof exam told students to write a speech on behalf of Chan Yat-sam (陳一心), the fictional spokesperson of the fictional group Caring Heung Shing Power (愛護香城力量), which is a parody of the group Caring Hong Kong Power. The speech required using Cultural Revolution ways of criticising fictional League of Social Democrats member Leung Heung-wa (梁向華) while promoting the fictional Chief Executive of Hong Kong Leung Ying-sau (梁英秀).

During the 2019–2020 Hong Kong protests, police shot a student, which prompted students to protest by shouting the phrase "Secondary Schools in Heung Shing" in reference to the fictional city. Protesters used LIHKG to discuss protest tactics. They shared a Google document titled "Heung Shing Online" that pretended to be a video game guide. They used the fictional city's name instead of Hong Kong in an attempt to evade possible repercussions. The document reviewed previous important battles, told demonstrators what to do or not do, and assessed how good defensive equipment was. It discussed what the game's various players should do such as a "dragon egg catcher" being tasked with putting out cases of tear gas.

== Analysis ==
Writing for Ming Pao, columnist Kengo Ip criticised the Hong Kong Examinations and Assessment Authority (HKEAA) for using the fictitious location of Heung Shing instead of the real city of Hong Kong. He said a fictional city allowed the HKEEA to mandate students to answer questions under the premises set by HKEAA. Rather than to discuss their own beliefs and knowledge on the exam, students had to demonstrate their prowess in being obedient. Ip called the construct "vivid verbal abuse that allowed those in power to interpret the authority of the world to play tricks on the 'cognition' of all students".

== Fictional history ==
Heung Shing is a fictional city that is very similar to Hong Kong. According to a 2001 exam, historians found that human activity in Heung Shing dates back over five millennia, as some Neolithic tombs were found in Pak Shue Tan (白樹灘) in 2001. Four species are unique to the fictional city: the Lu Lam-si tree frog (盧林氏樹蛙), the red dwarf dragonfly (紅侏儒蜻蜓), the Heung Shing newt (香城蠑螈), and the golden coin turtle.

The exam discusses a fictional couple living in Heung Shing: The husband is named Manlei (文理) and the wife is named Hangmui (杏梅). They got married in the 2002 exam and had a child named "Family Treasure" (家寶) in the 2012 exam. In each year's exam, the couple gets into arguments over their different beliefs about the morals and ethics of current events. Believing in modern values, the husband Manlei strongly supports the rule of law, freedom, and democracy. He does not believe in traditional Chinese cultural values. Hangmui, his wife, has the polar opposite beliefs. She believes that following Confucianism would help in societal matters and that decisions should take into account both feeling and reason.

The fictional city is known for its famous schools, including Hang Ten Secondary School (杏壇中學), its most famous; Bok Man Secondary School (博文中學); Gak Mat Secondary School (西區的格物中學); and Heung Shing Cultural University (香城文化大學). Lit Ji Hui (列子虛), a Heung Shing athlete, completed a 100 metres race in 9.69 seconds, setting a world record in a fictional race.

== Fictional geography ==
The fictional Heung Shing is located in Nam Kong (南江) and neighbours Nam Gwok (南國), Shen Shing (新城), and Sha Chau (沙洲). It is shaped like Taiwan after the latter is rotated clockwise by 90 degrees. A 2010 exam said that Nam Kong organised a book fair in 2005, which made number of people entering the Heung Shing Book Fair decrease by 40,000. Heung Shing's planning is "chaotic". It had five districts in the 2007 exam (north, south, east, west, and central), which dropped to four districts in the 2009 exam (the central district was removed), and reverted back to the original number of districts in the 2014 exam (but with the Heung Shing Tourism Bureau now located in the central district).

== See also ==
- Hong Kong Examinations and Assessment Authority
- Hong Kong Certificate of Education Examination
- Hong Kong Advanced Level Examination
