= Academies of Classical Learning =

Academic facilities of pre-modern east asia

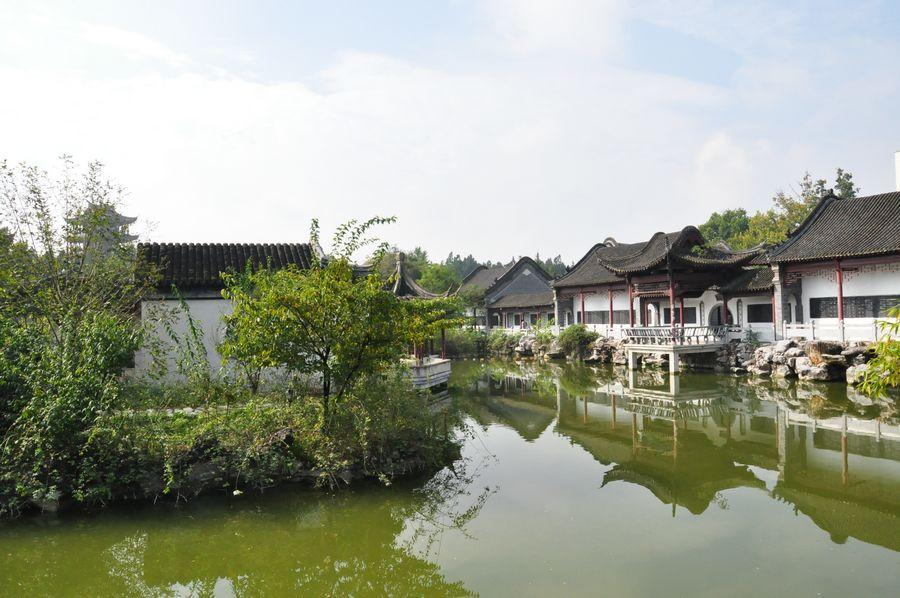
The Huazhou Academy in Henan

The Shuyuan (traditional Chinese: 書院; simplified Chinese: 书院; pinyin: shūyuàn), usually known in English as Academies of Classical Learning or simply Academies, were a type of school in Imperial China. Unlike national academies and district schools, shuyuan were usually private establishments built away from cities or towns, providing a quiet environment where scholars could engage in studies and contemplation without restrictions and worldly distractions.

== History ==
The shuyuan originated in 725 during the Tang dynasty. They were places where scholars could teach and study the classics, and where books collected from around the country could be preserved. By the late Tang dynasty, private academies had appeared all over China.

During the Northern Song (960–1126), many academies were established with government encouragement. Each academy had its own teaching and administrative structure and was economically independent.

The bestowal of a calligraphic signboard by the emperor was an extremely important symbol of an academy's status during the Northern Song period. The following academies received this honour:

- 997: Taishi Academy (Songyang Academy), bestowed by the Emperor Taizong of Song
- 1009: Yingtianfu Academy, bestowed by the Emperor Zhenzong
- 1015: Yuelu Academy, bestowed by Emperor Zhenzong
- 1035: Shigu Academy, bestowed by Emperor Renzong of Song

Besides signboards, emperors also bestowed books. In 977, the Taizong Emperor bestowed on the White Deer Grotto Academy a copy of the Nine Chinese classics printed by the Guozijian. The Yuelu Academy, the Songyang Academy and other academies also received books from the Emperor on a number of occasions.

However, academies had begun to decline by the twelfth century. The White Deer Grotto Academy, which had fallen into ruin, was rebuilt by the prominent neo-Confucianist Zhu Xi in 1179–80 during the Southern Song (1127–1279) and reopened in 1180. It became an important centre of Confucian thought during eight centuries. Zhu Xi himself taught here during the Southern Song as did Wang Yangming during the Ming. As a result of Zhu Xi's efforts, the shuyuan became a permanent feature of Chinese education, taking up major responsibilities of local education.

The system of academies was dismantled under the Yuan dynasty (1271–1368) and all academies were placed under government control to become preparatory schools for the imperial examinations. However, the system was revived under the Ming (1368–1644) and the Qing (1644–1911).

In the Ming dynasty, academies devoted to discussing political issues appeared, such as the Donglin Academy, often resulting in political repression. According to one study, 40% of the 1239 known Ming academies were built during the Jiajing era (1522–1566). During the Qing, thousands of academies were created for the purpose of preparing students for the Imperial Examination, although there were still some that functioned as centres of study and research.

The academies were finally abolished under the Hundred Days' Reform in 1898 at the end of the Qing dynasty.

There were more than 7,000 academies recorded. In the late Qing dynasty, some became universities, middle schools, public libraries and museums.

In Korea, which also adopted Confucianism, the shuyuan were known as Seowon.

== Shuyuan as a modern term ==
In the late Qing dynasty, schools teaching Western science and technology were established. Many such schools were called Shuyuan in Chinese. Despite the common name, these shuyuan are quite modern in concept and are quite different from traditional academies of classical learning.

== Notable academies ==
In discussing the shuyuan, it is common to speak of the "Four Great Academies" (四大书院; sì-dà shū-yuàn) of ancient China. Usually the "Four Great Academies" refers to the Four Great Academies of the Northern Song. However, sources give a number of different lists, sometimes expanded to Six or Eight Great Academies. Only one, the Yuelu Academy (later become Hunan University), appears in all lists. Each school went up or down the list in different periods. White Deer Grotto Academy had long been important. As for the impact on the politics of China, Donglin Academy in the Ming Dynasty is especially notable.

=== The Four Great Academies ===
Also known as the Four Great Academies of the Northern Song or the Four Northern Song Academies.

- Songyang Academy (in modern Dengfeng) - founded in 1035
- Yingtianfu Academy (in modern Shangqiu) - founded in 1009
- Yuelu Academy (in modern Changsha) - founded in 976
- White Deer Grotto Academy (in modern Jiujiang) - founded in 940

Sometimes the Shigu Academy is substituted for the Songyang Academy.

=== The Four Great Academies of the Early Song ===
- Shigu Academy (in modern Hengyang) - founded in 810
- Jinshan Academy (in modern Jurong, Jiangsu) - founded in 1024
- Yuelu Academy
- Culai Academy (in modern Tai'an) - founded in 1038

=== The Four Great Academies of the Southern Song ===
- Lize Academy
- Xiangshan Academy
- Yuelu Academy
- White Deer Grotto Academy

=== The Six Great Academies ===
- Songyang Academy
- Yingtianfu Academy
- Yuelu Academy
- White Deer Grotto Academy
- Shigu Academy
- Maoshan Academy (renamed Jinshan Academy)

(An alternative list of "Six Great Academies of the Northern Song" contains the same academies in a different order.)

=== The Eight Great Academies of the Northern Song ===
- Shigu Academy
- Yingtianfu Academy
- Yuelu Academy
- White Deer Grotto Academy
- Songyang Academy
- Maoshan Academy
- Longmen Academy
- Culai Academy

== See also ==
- Donglin Academy
- Dongpo Academy
- Yuelu Academy
- Seowon, the Korean equivalent of Shuyuan
