= Taiwan Scholarship =

Scholarship for international students to study in Taiwan

The Taiwan Scholarship is a scholarship for international students who possess prior excellent academic performance and good moral character. The program began in 2004 as the jointly established Scholarship Program of Taiwan funded by the Ministry of Education, Ministry of Foreign Affairs, Ministry of Economic Affairs, and Ministry of Science and Technology of the Executive Yuan of the Government of the Republic of China (Taiwan). Currently, there are four types of scholarship programs: MOE Scholarships, MOFA Scholarships, MOEA scholarships and NSC Scholarships.

Taiwan Scholarships fund two to four years of study at any university in Taiwan and are applicable to any field of study. Different scholarships may cover different types of expenses including tuition, room and board, textbooks, round-trip tickets and medical insurance. However, all of these scholarships provide students with a monthly stipend. Approximately 400 scholars are selected each year. The majority of Scholars choose to attend either National Taiwan University, National Chengchi University, National Cheng Kung University, or one of the other major Taipei institutions, but scholars have attended a wide range of universities throughout Taiwan.

== See also ==
- Scholarships in Taiwan
- Taipei Economic and Cultural Representative Office
- Huayu Enrichment Scholarship
- List of universities in Taiwan
