= Zhongwen Shuiping Kaoshi =

Test of Standard Chinese proficiency for non-native Chinese speakers

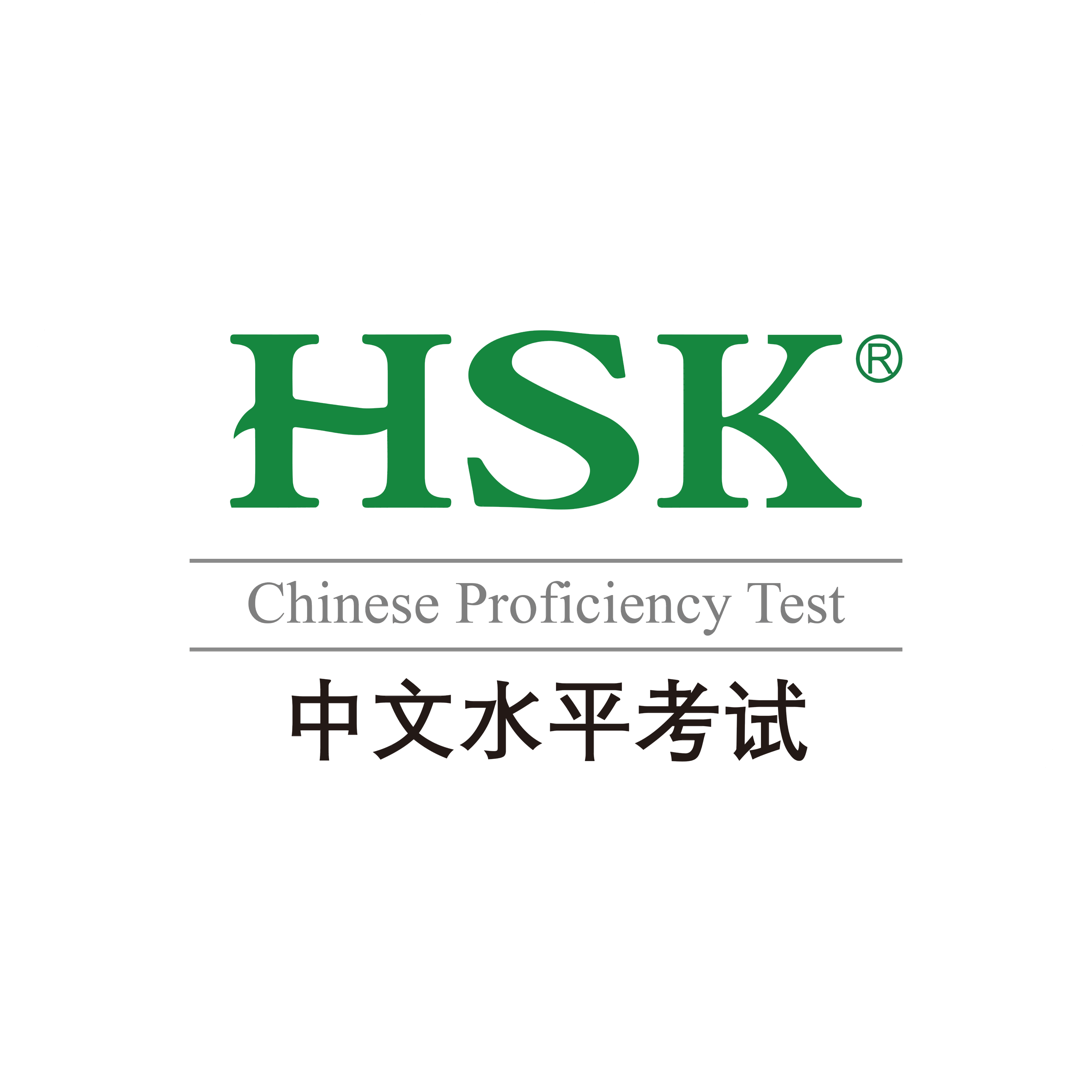
- Acronym: HSK
- Type: Paper-based Test, Internet-based Test (at center), Internet-based Test (at home)
- Administrator: Ministry of Education of China
- Skills tested: Listening, reading, writing, and speaking of Chinese language.
- Purpose: To assess the Chinese language and Simplified Chinese characters proficiency of non-native speakers.
- Year started: 1992 (as HSK 1.0); 2010 (as HSK 2.0); 2021 (as HSK 3.0)
- Score range: 1 to 9
- Score validity: 2 years
- Regions: More than 1,522 test centres in over 169 countries
- Languages: Standard Chinese
- Annual number of test takers: 800,000 Test takers
- Prerequisites: Intended for non-native Mandarin speakers, The global demand for Chinese language learners and Chinese mainland education institutions
- Website: chinesetest.cn

The Zhongwen Shuiping Kaoshi (HSK, abbreviation of the old name Hanyu Shuiping Kaoshi; Chinese: 中文水平考试; pinyin: Zhōngwén Shuǐpíng Kǎoshì), translated as the Chinese Proficiency Test, is the People's Republic of China's standardized test of proficiency in the Standard Chinese language for non-native speakers. The test is administered by the National Chinese Proficiency Test Committee, an agency of the Ministry of Education of China.

The test cannot be taken in Taiwan, where only Taiwan's TOCFL exam can be taken. In turn, the TOCFL exam is not available in Mainland China.

== Background ==
Development of the HSK test began in 1984 at Beijing Language and Culture University, and was officially made a national standardized test in 1992. By 2005, over 120 countries had participated as regular host sites and the tests had been taken around 100 million times, including domestic ethnic minority candidates. In 2011, Beijing International Chinese College became the first HSK testing center to conduct the HSK test online.

The HSK test is analogous to the English TOEFL, and an HSK certificate is valid without any limitation in China. The test aims to be a certificate of language proficiency for higher educational and professional purposes. It is not uncommon to refer to a standard or level of proficiency by the HSK level number, or score. For example, a job description might ask for foreign applicants with "HSK5 or better."

The HSK is administered solely in Mandarin and in simplified Chinese characters; however, if the exam is paper-based, the test-taker can choose to write the writing assignments in simplified or in traditional characters, at their discretion. The test can be either paper-based or Internet-based, depending on what the specific test center offers. With an Internet-based test, the writing part with characters is subjectively slightly easier, as one types the pinyin and selects the right character from the list, while with a paper-based test, one must remember the characters, their strokes and their order, and write them out.

Test takers with outstanding results can win a scholarship for short-term language study in China.

== Structure ==
=== HSK 3.0 (2025- Present) ===
On November 15, 2025, the official HSK 3.0 exam syllabus was released at the 2025 World Chinese Language Conference in Beijing, resolving the years of uncertainty following the 2021 framework announcement.

Built upon the 2021 standard, the syllabus lowered the vocabulary requirements at the beginner and intermediate levels. It also made speaking tests mandatory from Level 3 onwards. The syllabus took effect November 18, 2025, a global trial exam was held January 31, 2026. As of July 2026, the full rollout of HSK 3.0 exams have yet to be implemented.

New HSK 3.0 exam structure
Level	Written test						Speaking test	
Level	Listening		Reading		Writing		Speaking test	
Level	Questions	Time	Questions	Time	Questions	Time	Items	Time
HSK 1	20	~12 min	20	20 min	Not tested		Not tested	
HSK 2	25	~17 min	25	25 min	10	10 min	Not tested	
HSK 3	30	~23 min	30	30 min	10	20 min	15	~15 min
HSK 4	32	~20 min	32	30 min	6	25 min	5	~20 min
HSK 5	35	~25 min	35	35 min	2	40 min	5	~23 min
HSK 6	40	~30 min	40	40 min	2	45 min	5	~23 min
HSK 7-9	40	~33 min	40	50 min	2	55 min	5	~20 min
HSK 7-9	40	~33 min	40	50 min	Translation (Note: Languages of Chinese translation are English, Korean, Japanese, Thai, Vietnamese, Mongolian, Spanish and Russian)			
HSK 7-9	40	~33 min	40	50 min	2	35 min	2	~7 min

New HSK 3.0 syllabus
Level	Band	Words		Characters (recognition)		Characters (writing)		Grammar points	
Level	Band	introduced	cumulative	introduced	cumulative	introduced	cumulative	introduced	cumulative
Beginner	1	300	300	246	246	0	0	70	70
Beginner	2	200	500	125	371	100	100	78	148
Beginner	3	500	1000	284	655	150	250	96	244
Intermediate	4	1000	2000	441	1096	150	400	95	339
Intermediate	5	1600	3600	431	1527	150	550	70	409
Intermediate	6	1800	5400	413	1940	150	700	50	459
Advanced	7–9	5600	11000	1148	3088	500	1200	134	593
Total		11000		3088		1200		593	

== Old structure ==
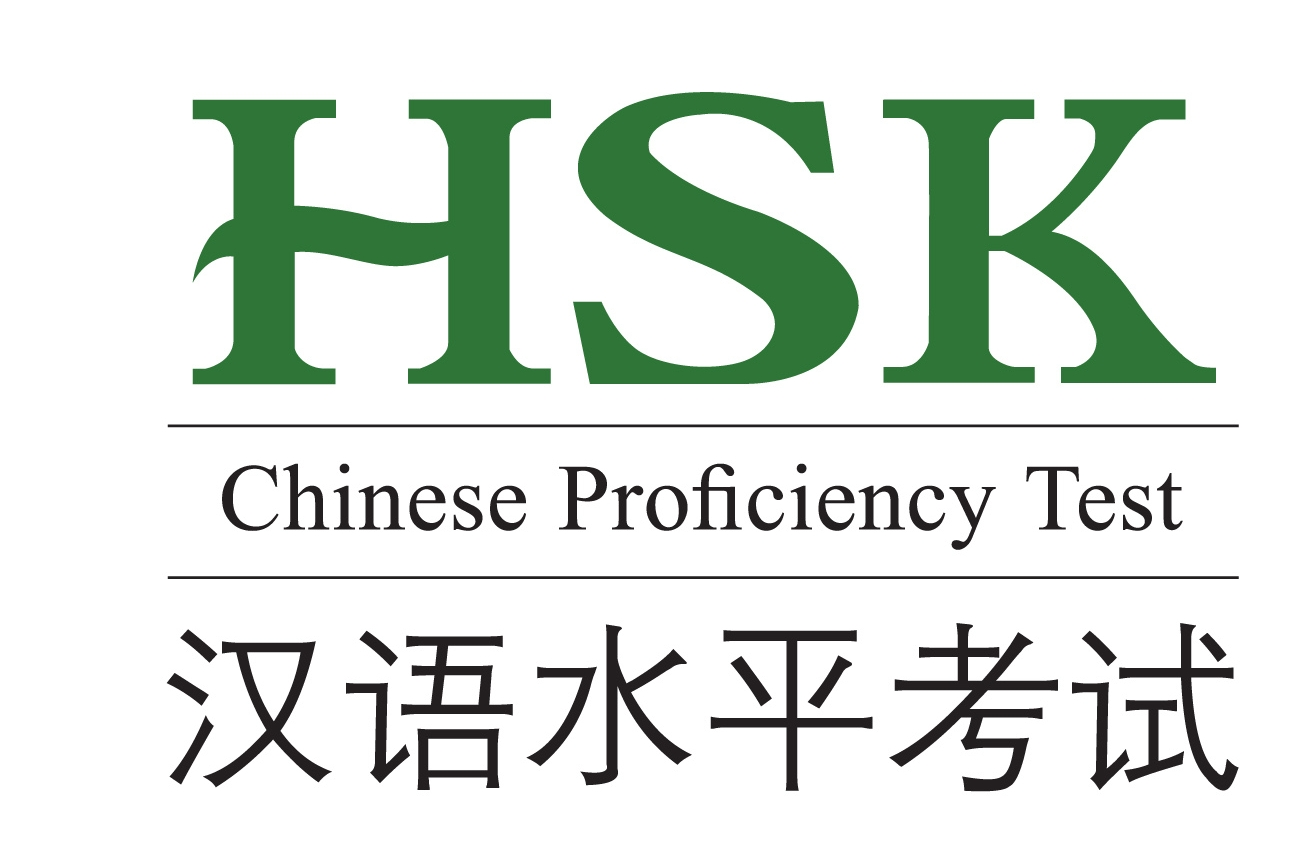
Hanyu Shuiping Kaoshi logo, prior to the name and logo changes

=== HSK 3.0 (2021–2025) ===
In 2020, an internal Chinese academic paper discussed that the Chinese Proficiency Standards would undergo a change: a hybrid paradigm of "Three Stages and Nine Levels" characterized by all-in-one integration. The Ministry of Education of the People's Republic of China announced further details regarding HSK 3.0 on April 1, 2021. Among the information shared was a wordlist for each individual stage, and a date for the introduction of the new test—July 1, 2021. Newer grammar practice materials for the intermediate and advanced levels published by the Beijing Language and Culture University Press were released in September and December 2022.

HSK 2021 3.0 included a focus on handwritten Chinese characters and translation, which was not included in HSK 2.0. Also there was a redistribution of words in each level. For instance, some words were previously grouped under Level 3, but then were under Level 1 in HSK 3.0.

Although the HSK 7–9 exam officially launched in March 2022, the launch of the 1–6 levels was delayed for this entire period. The HSK 1–6 exams remained on HSK 2.0 until the official release of the 2025 revision.

New HSK 3.0 (2021–2025) syllabus
Level	Band	Syllables		Words		Characters (recognition)		Characters (writing)		Grammar points	
Level	Band	introduced	cumulative	introduced	cumulative	introduced	cumulative	introduced	cumulative	introduced	cumulative
Beginner	1	269	269	500	500	300	300	300	300	48	48
Beginner	2	199	468	772	1272	300	600	300	300	81	129
Beginner	3	140	608	973	2245	300	900	300	300	81	210
Intermediate	4	116	724	1000	3245	300	1200	400	700	76	286
Intermediate	5	98	822	1071	4316	300	1500	400	700	71	357
Intermediate	6	86	908	1140	5456	300	1800	400	700	67	424
Advanced	7–9	202	1110	5636	11092	1200	3000	500	1200	148	572
Total		1110		11092		3000		1200		572	

=== HSK 2.0 (2010–2021) ===
The previous format was introduced in 2010, with a philosophy of testing "comprehensive language and communication ability". Most notable are the inclusion of written segments at all levels (not just in the Advanced levels as in the pre-2010 test), a reform of the ranking system, and the use of new question structures. Complete vocabulary lists, previous tests, and simulated tests are available as preparation materials. A minor update of the vocabulary lists was made in 2012.

The HSK consists of a written test and an oral test, which are taken separately. This oral test is also known as the HSKK or Chinese: 汉语水平口语考试; pinyin: Hànyǔ Shuǐpíng Kǒuyǔ Kǎoshì.

==== Written test ====
Level	Vocabulary				Written test			Description
Level	Words (cumulative / new)		Characters (cumulative / new)		Listening	Reading	Writing	Description
1	150	150	174	174	20 questions, 15 min	20 questions, 17 min	Not tested	Designed for learners who can understand and use some simple Chinese characters and sentences to communicate, and prepares them for continuing their Chinese studies. In HSK 1 all characters are provided along with pinyin.
2	300	150	348	174	35 questions, 25 min	25 questions, 22 min	Not tested	Designed for learners who can use Chinese in a simple and direct manner, applying it in a basic fashion to their daily lives. In HSK 2 all characters are provided along with pinyin.
3	600	300	618	270	40 questions	30 questions	10 items	Designed for learners who can use Chinese to serve the demands of their personal lives, studies and work, and are capable of completing most of the communicative tasks they experience during their Chinese tour.
4	1200	600	1064	446	45 questions	40 questions	15 items	Designed for learners who can discuss a relatively wide range of topics in Chinese and are capable of communicating with Chinese speakers at a high standard.
5	2500	1300	1685	621	45 questions	45 questions	10 items	Designed for learners who can read Chinese newspapers and magazines, watch Chinese films and are capable of writing and delivering a lengthy speech in Chinese.
6	5000	2500	2663	978	50 questions	50 questions	1 composition	Designed for learners who can easily understand any information communicated in Chinese and are capable of smoothly expressing themselves in written or oral form.

The Listening, Reading and Writing tests each have a maximum score of 100. HSK 1 and 2 therefore have a maximum score of 200 with 120 points required to pass. HSK 3 and 4 have a maximum of 300 points with 180 points required to pass. There is no minimum number of points required for each of the sections as long as the sum is over 120 or 180 points respectively.

HSK 5 and 6 also have a maximum of 300 points and originally required a score of 180 points to pass. However, since a decision made in February 2013, there has been no official passing score for either HSK 5 or 6.

Hanban provides examples of the exam for the different levels together with a list of words that need to be known for each level. These examples are also available (together with the audio for the Listening Test) on the websites of the Confucius Institute at QUT and HSK Academy.

An HSK 2.0 (Level 6) Examination Score Report

==== Online test ====
The written version is now available in two forms, a computer and a paper based test. Both tests are still held at test centers, the differences between the two are as follows:

- Not every test center has the facilities for conducting computer-based tests
- Computer-based tests allow you to input characters using the keyboard
- Results of computer-based tests are published two weeks after the exam, paper-based test results take one month

==== Oral test ====
The HSKK test is a separate test. However, the three HSKK levels correspond with the six HSK levels of the written test.

HSK level	HSKK level	CEFR	Words	Questions	Minutes
1	Beginner	A	200	27	17
2	Beginner	A	200	27	17
3	Intermediate	B	900	14	21
4	Intermediate	B	900	14	21
5	Advanced	C	3000	6	24
6	Advanced	C	3000	6	24

==== Comparison with CEFR levels ====
In 2010, Hanban asserted that the HSK's six levels corresponded to the six levels of the Common European Framework of Reference for Languages (CEFR). However, the German and French associations of Chinese language teachers reject this equivalency, arguing that HSK Level 6 is only equivalent to CEFR Level B2 or C1.

HSK			Estimated CEFR level				
Level	Words (sum)	Characters (sum)	Hanban	France	Germany	Italy	TOCFL
6	5000	2663	C2	B2 to C1	B2	B1+ to B2	B2
5	2500	1685	C1	B1 to B2	B1	A2+ to B1	B1
4	1200	1064	B2	A2	A2	A1+ to A2	A2
3	600	618	B1	A1 to A2	A1	A1.1 to A1.2	A1
2	300	348	A2	A1.1	A1.1 (without writing)	A1.1	Below A1
1	150	174	A1	Below A1	Below A1	Below A1	Below A1

=== HSK 1.0 (Before 2010) ===
Test Rank (等第)	Vocabulary (cumulative)	Score (级别)	Certificate
Advanced	Characters: 2865; Words: 8840	11	Advanced A
Advanced	Characters: 2865; Words: 8840	10	Advanced B
Advanced	Characters: 2865; Words: 8840	9	Advanced C*
Advanced	Characters: 2865; Words: 8840	—	none
Elementary/Intermediate	Characters: 2194; Words: 5257	8	Intermediate A
Elementary/Intermediate	Characters: 2194; Words: 5257	7	Intermediate B
Elementary/Intermediate	Characters: 2194; Words: 5257	6	Intermediate C
Elementary/Intermediate	Characters: 1603; Words: 3052	5	Elementary A
Elementary/Intermediate	Characters: 1603; Words: 3052	4	Elementary B
Elementary/Intermediate	Characters: 1603; Words: 3052	3	Elementary C**
Elementary/Intermediate	Characters: 1603; Words: 3052	—	none
Basic	Characters: 800; Words: 1033	3	Basic A
Basic	Characters: 800; Words: 1033	2	Basic B
Basic	Characters: 800; Words: 1033	1	Basic C
Basic	Characters: 800; Words: 1033	—	none
_{*Generally signifies a professional level. **Generally required for non-language academic programs.}

==== Ranking ====
Formerly, there were 11 possible ranks (1–11) and 3 test formats (Basic, Elementary/Intermediate, and Advanced). A rank of between 3 and 8 was needed to enroll in a Chinese university, depending on the subject being studied. A score of 9 or higher was a common business standard.

A student taking the Basic test (基础HSK) could attain a rank of 1 through 3 (1级–3级), or fail to meet requirements and thus not receive a rank. The Elementary/Intermediate test (初中等HSK) covered ranks 3–8 (3级–8级), with ranks below 3 not considered. Likewise, the Advanced test (高等HSK) covered ranks 9–11 (9级–11级), with scores below 9 not considered.

==== Content ====
The previous format for both Basic and Elementary/Intermediate HSK included four sections: listening comprehension, grammar structures, reading comprehension, and written expressions. Aside from the written expressions portion (which requires writing of Chinese characters), these two tests were completely multiple-choice. The Advanced HSK however, added an additional two portions: spoken and written.

== Test dates and locations ==
The HSK is held at designated test centers in China and abroad. A list of test centers can be found at the HSK website. Test dates are published annually and written tests are more frequently held than spoken ones, generally around once a month, depending on the test center. Test registration is usually open until 30 days prior to the actual test date for the paper-based test or around 10 days prior the actual test date for the computer-based test. Results are generally available around 30 days after completion (but no definite date is given for results).

The test cannot be taken in Taiwan (The Republic of China). In Taiwan, only the TOCFL exam can be taken. Conversely, the TOCFL can not be taken in Mainland China, Macau and Hong Kong.

== See also ==
- Test of Chinese as a Foreign Language – the Chinese language test used in Taiwan
- ZHC – a Chinese language written test intended for native speakers in China
- Putonghua Proficiency Test – a Chinese language oral test intended for native speakers in China
- CTCSOL – Certificate for Teachers of Chinese to Speakers of Other Languages
- List of language proficiency tests
