= Huayu Enrichment Scholarship =

Scholarship for foreign students learning Chinese in Taiwan

The MOFA (Ministry of Foreign Affairs) Huayu Enrichment Scholarship (HES) is a competitively awarded international scholarship for studying the Mandarin language in Taiwan. The program aims to help scholarship recipients acquire a better command of Mandarin Chinese, and hence a greater understanding and appreciation of Taiwan's culture; promote friendship between people in Taiwan and in countries around the world; and generate opportunities to increase exchange with international educational institutions. The award is not limited to countries with diplomatic ties with Taiwan.

According to the Taipei Economic and Cultural Representative Office (TECO) in San Francisco, the purpose of the HES is "The Ministry of Education (MOE) in Taiwan provides the Huayu Enrichment Scholarship for foreign Mandarin/Chinese learners including beginners to study at any accredited Mandarin center at a university or college in Taiwan." 2025, more than 1500 students from more than 80 countries were awarded the Huayu Enrichment Scholarship or Taiwan Scholarship. In accordance with the New Southbound Policy, a large portion of those students were from South East Asia, including 95 Malaysian, 82 Philippine and 52 Australian students. As a result of the close political and economical ties to the United States, many US-American students are also awarded the scholarship (187 in 2022). African and European students are much rarer awarded scholarships; students from Austria, Croatia and Slovakia received a combined 5 full-year scholarships, Switzerland and Liechtenstein a combined 6 full-year scholarships.

Huayu Scholars may take Chinese language courses at any university or college-affiliated Mandarin training center. The scholarship can be awarded for two, three, six, nine, or twelve months. Scholars receive a monthly maintenance stipend of NT$28,000 (~898 USD as of 2026) in order to cover accommodation and living expenses. Awards are distributed through the university or college which the recipient will be attending; the document states that no additional subsidy will be given.

== See also ==
- Scholarships in Taiwan
- List of Chinese language schools in Taiwan
- Taipei Economic and Cultural Representative Office
- Taiwan Scholarship
- Mandarin Training Center
- Mandarin Learning Center
