= Majumdar Rajiv Lochan Das =

Founder of Kadirpara Munshi family

Mahātmā Majumdar Rajiv Lochan Das Founder of Kadirpara Munshi family
- মজুমদার রাজীবলোচন দাস
- Born: 17th century Shailkupa (now Jhenaidah District, Bangladesh)
- Died: Kadirpara Estate, Bengal (now Magura District, Bangladesh)
- Successor: Hariram Das; Ramram Das; Munshi Balaram Das
- Spouse: Shivani Thakurani
- Children: Hariram Das; Ramram Das; Munshi Balaram Das
- Father: Gourihar Majumdar

Majumdar Rajiv Lochan Das was one of the earliest patriarchs of the extended Munshi family of Kadirpara-Chougachi. He was the father of Hariram Das, Ramram Das and Munshi Balaram Das, and was the first individual of the Das family (later known as the Munshis) to settle in Kadirpara (present-day Kadirpara Union, Sreepur Upazila, Magura District, Bangladesh).

== Background ==
Following a dispute with Ballal Sen of the Sena dynasty, Tilak Karkat and Jatadhar Nag of the Barendra Kayastha clan established a separate state in the Shailkupa region of Jessore. Members of the Barendra Kulin lineage—specifically the Das, Nandy, and Chaki families—subsequently joined them and settled in the area. According to Satish Chandra Mitra, the eponymous progenitor of the Das Kulin was Nardas of the Atri lineage; some sources refer to him as Narahari or Naradev Das (often mentioned as Mahatma Naradev Das). His descendants moved through various places due to conflict and changing circumstances, eventually settling in the Devtala area of Shailkupa. In time, the Nawab administration granted them the title of Majumdar. At Shailkupa, the Dases built a shrine dedicated to the deities of Rama and Gopal (Krishna) once served by an ascetic, while Krishnananda (also referred to as Bhabananda) of the Das family assumed the responsibilities to serve the deities.

The idols of Ram (left) and Gopal (right), the deities traditionally served by Munshi family

Due to persistent raids by Arakanese and Portuguese pirates, Krishnananda's eighth descendant, Rajiv Lochan, relocated from Shailkupa to Dariapur and later to Kadirpara after acquiring property there. He is regarded as the founder of the Kadirpara Munshi family.

== Family ==
Rajiv Lochan was married to Shivani Thakurani. The couple had three sons named Hariram, Ramram, and Durgaram (later known as Munshi Balaram Das). All three siblings were known for their intellect and formidable presence, qualities that drew the attention of Raja Sitaram Ray. According to both Satish Chandra Mitra and Jadunath Bhattacharya, Balaram and his elder brother Ramram once repelled a group of fearsome robbers with remarkable courage. Impressed by their bravery, Raja Sitaram Ray granted them the tax-exempt village of Bilpakuria. Subsequently, Ramram assumed the power of administration of the Bilpakuria taluq. On the other hand, the Raja eventually appointed Balaram as a Munshi in his court, and his descendants have since continued to bear the hereditary title of Munshi. Ramram's and Balaram's rise in status enabled them to accumulate substantial wealth in Kadirpara, eventually contributing to the formation of the Kadirpara Estate. The ancestors of Rajiv Lochan used to carry the titles Rai, Rai-Raiyan, and sarkar.

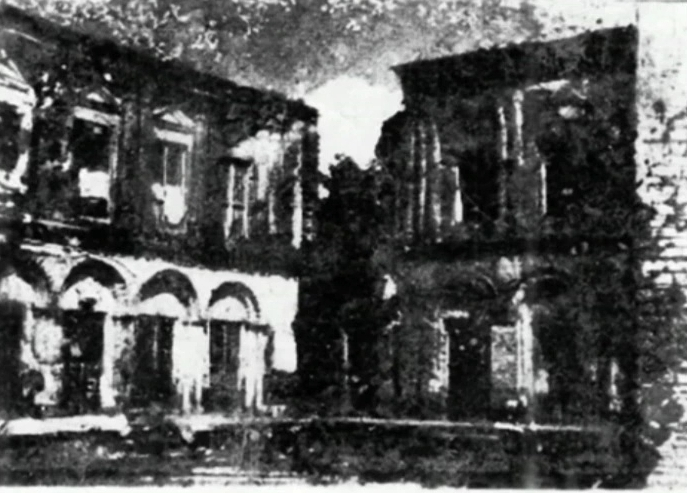
An old photograph of Kadirpara Babu Zamindar Bari

== Contributions to society ==
Rajiv Lochan was active in religious and philanthropic endeavours in Kadirpara. He and his descendants founded temples dedicated to Shri Shri Radhakanta, Shiva lingam, Dasabhuja, and Shri Shri Lakshmi-Narayan and instituted the observance of traditional annual festivals (the Baro maase tero parbon). According to a 2017 report in the Dhaka Tribune, the Radhakanta Lakshmi Narayan Jiu and Shitala temples in Sreepur Upazila, belonging to the Debuttar Estate, were subjected to acts of vandalism. His household maintained a strong tradition of hospitality. The estate included several inner courts and a council hall, and was served by six nearby reservoirs-known locally as Pachhpukura, Kaliyatala and Dighi Pushkarini among others. His wife, Shivani Thakurani, commissioned a large reservoir on the north-eastern side of the residence, south of the Bil field; this waterbody became known as Bilpukur.

He was proficient in Persian. Due to the language's prestige at the time, he appointed two Muslim scholars, Sayyid Aftab and Mahatab, as instructors to advance his studies.

Rajiv Lochan also commissioned and installed the clay idol of Shri Shri Siddheshwari Kali at Dariapur. For the purpose of its regular worship, he endowed approximately 40 bighas of tax-exempt debutter land in Dariapur and adjoining mouzas. This land was registered under Jessore Collectorate Touji No. 4968, for which he appointed a dedicated sevait. The first sevait was Raicharan, succeeded by Haran Chandra Chakraborty. After the death of Haran Chandra, the service was taken up successively by Lokenath Mishra of Utkal, his nephew Paramananda Mishra, and later Gobindachandra Poti. The temple has suffered multiple attacks by local Muslim mobs in the past. Most recently, in 2022, the shrine experienced an incident of theft.

Rajiv Lochan endowed numerous religious and service-related grants. He donated portions of his property as debuttar, brahmottar, and bhogottar lands for temple use and to support resident priests; he also assigned a mahatran (hereditary allotment) of house property to Ramchandra Roy, a Singha-lineage Barendra Kayastha, for the performance of daily and memorial rites. At or soon after his lifetime, his family donated approximately forty bighas of tax-exempt land from the Kadirpara taluq to fund the annual worship of the temple deity (dedicated to Shiva). Patiram Banik of Radhanagar was appointed as the hereditary sebayet (temple attendant), and Uddhav Chandra Ghosh of Nakol received forty bighas to supply dairy and festival provisions (curd, milk, chhana, ghee, butter, etc.). The village of Radhanagar was established in the name of the family deity, Radhakanta Jiu; Rajiv Lochan's descendants later developed a market, school, and post office in that village.

== Legacy ==
Rajiv Lochan's life has been mentioned in the Bengali book Jessore-Khulnar Itihas (History of Jessore-Khulna) by Satish Chandra Mitra. A detailed account of his life and works was published in the Bengali book Munshianay Chollish Purush, edited by Santanu Ghosh and reviewed by Anandabazar Patrika.

== Family tree ==
- Majumdar Rajivlochan Das (married to Shivani Thakurani)
  - Hariram Das
    - Premnarayan Munshi
      - Krishnakanta Munshi
        - Sambhunath Munshi
          - Harinath Munshi
  - Ramram Das
    - Radhakrishna Munshi
      - Raghunath Munshi
        - Gabindanath Munshi
          - Gatinath Munshi
            - Tejendra Munshi
            - Hemendra Munshi
          - Chandranath Munshi
            - Jatindranath Munshi
            - Gopendranath Munshi
        - Krishnanath Munshi
          - Dwarakanath Munshi
            - Trailakyanath Munshi
          - Jadunath Munshi
  - Munshi Balaram Das (childless, succeeded by Ramram's son Radhakrishna)
