= Chakrapani Dasa =

Poet, feudal king and Buddhist scholar during late 9th century

- Deva Pradhana; Mahātmā; Mahakavi

Chief of Devas
- Reign: 9th century
- Predecessor: Tankapani Dasa
- Successor: Dhiradasa; Suradasa
- Issue: dhiradasa Suradasa
- Dynasty: Barendra Dasa (later, known as the Munshis of Kadirpara-Chougachi)
- Father: Tankapani Dasa
- Religion: Hinduism

Chakrapani Dasa was a Bengali poet, feudal king and Buddhist scholar from Bengal during 9th century. He belonged to the Das family belonging to the Barendra Kayastha clan, which later became famous as Munshi family since his descendant Munshi Balaram Das was appointed as the court Munshi by Raja Sitaram Ray during 17th century. His descendants had cantrolled over Kadirpara Estate and Chougachi Estate.

Chakrapani Dasa, son of Tankadas (also known as Tankapani Dasa, the chief royal scribe to Dharmapala of Bengal) has been called as the 'Chief of Devas' by poet Kashidasa in Varendrakaranabarnana. (Note: During that period, samantas were commonly addressed by the honorifics 'Deva' or 'Thakur'. Chakrapani is believed to have been one such samanta-ruler.) According to Nagendranath Basu, he became famous as 'Mahakavi' (Great Poet) during his era. He has been mentioned as Chakadas in Tibetan Buddhist text. Mahamahopadhyaya Satish Chandra Vidyabhusan dedicated a scholarly essay titled Kayastha Chakadas in his name. During Chakrapani, Brahmins started gaining prominence in the royal court of Devapala, the third Pala Emperor. According to Santanu Ghosh, due to Brahmin intrigue, Chakrapani left Pataliputra, the capital of Pala Empire with his sons dhiradasa and Suradasa, and later settled in Barendra.

== Family tree ==
- Mankhadasa
  - Tankapani Dasa
    - Chakrapani Dasa
      - Dhiradasa
      - Suradasa (settled in Barendra)
        - Sridhara
          - Bhudhara
          - Gadadhara
            - Rajyadhara (Cooch Behar)
              - Arya Sridhara (Samantapradhana at Kamrupa)
                - Dharadhara (also known as Lakshmikara Thakur)
                  - Sulapani (also known as Bangsadhara Thakur)
                    - Pinakapani
                      - Tankapani
                        - Ratnapani
                          - Narasimha Das (also known as Narahari Das, Naradev Das, and Naradasa Thakur, contemporary of Sena Emperor Ballal Sena)
                            - Mahasamanta Vatudasa
                              - Mahamandalik Shridharadasa
                            - Patudas (childless)
                            - Bhuvanadi
                            - Sridharadas (revered in Barendra society)
                            - Hayagriva
                    - Chakrapani (also known as Bangsadhara Thakur)
                      - Devadhara (also known as Sridhara Thakur, Mantri of Nanyadeva, founder of the Karnat dynasty of Mithila)
