= Shridharadasa =

- Mahamandalika (Great ruler of a 'Mandala')
- Reign: Late 12th century-early 13th century
- Predecessor: Vatudasa
- Dynasty: Barendra Dasa (later, known as the Munshis of Kadirpara-Chougachi)
- Father: Vatudasa
- Religion: Hinduism

Shridharadasa, also spelt Sridhar Das, was a Bengali poetry anthologist and feudal king belonging to the ancient Barendra Kayastha Dasa family. The family later became famous as the Munshi family when his descendant Munshi Balaram Das was appointed as the court Munshi by Raja Sitaram Ray during 17th century. Shridharadasa is remembered for the compilation named Saduktikarnamrita, an anthology of Sanskrit verses during 1127 sakabda (1205 AD) and during the reign of Sena Emperor Lakshmana Sena. Shridharadasa was the son of Mahasamanta Shri Vatudasa and grandson of Narasimha Dasa. In the colophon of Saduktikarnamrita, he described himself as Mahamandalika (a great ruler of an administrative unit called 'Mandala') under Sena Empire. He was patronized by Lakshmana Sena.

== Saduktikarnamrita ==
Saduktikarnamrita (excellent sayings which are like nectar for human hearing) is a Sanskrit verse-anthology compiled by Shridharadasa, generally placed in the Sena period of Bengal. It is regarded as one of the major Bengali Sanskrit anthologies, following Vidyākara's Subhashita-ratna-kosha. Shridharadasa's Saduktikarnamrita is the second compiled Sanskrit anthology of poetry from ancient Bengal discovered so far, while the first one is Vidyakara's Subhashita-ratna-kosha. Saduktikarnamrita preserves 2,377 verses drawn from many earlier poets and shares 623 stanzas in common with Vidyakara’s collection. The work is organized into five large thematic divisions called pravāhas (“streams”), each further broken into vichis (“waves”). These sections group verses on subjects such as the gods, love and the seasons, flattery, a wide range of natural and cultural topics (rivers, mountains, animals, flowers, trees), and reflections on human life, poets, age and time. Shridharadasa selected poems from both classical Sanskrit authors including contemporary Bengali poets and Sena-court figures. The anthology is especially rich in devotional verses, with a strong Vaishnava emphasis, reflecting religious currents of its time. Beyond its literary value, Saduktikarnamrita is important for cultural history: it preserves excerpts from otherwise lost works, shows the tastes of medieval Bengali literary circles, and offers glimpses of everyday life and social attitudes in early medieval Bengal. The vast anthology was later edited by noted Sanskrit scholar Ram Avatar Sharma and renowned historian Sures Chandra Banerji.

=== Poets quoted in Saduktikarnamrita ===
Shridharadasa drew upon a wide range of poets when compiling Saduktikarnamrita. The anthology includes verses attributed to classical Sanskrit poets such as Kalidasa, Bhavabhuti, Amaru and Rajashekhara, as well as to numerous poets from Bengal and neighbouring regions. Among these are writers associated with the Pala and Sena courts, including Jayadeva, Umapatidhara, Sharan, Dhoyi and Govardhana. The work also cites royal authors such as Ballala Sena, Lakshmana Sena and Keshava Sena. In addition, Shridharadasa quoted a number of Bengali poets or who were at least easterners of the Pala Empire, which includes figures such as Yogeshvara, Satananda, Abhinanda, Dharaṇidhara, Varaha, Acala, Vallana, Manovinoda, Subhanka, Chakrapani and Laksmidhara.

== Family tree ==
- Mankhadasa
  - Tankapani Dasa
    - Chakrapani Dasa
      - Dhiradasa
      - Suradasa (settled in Barendra)
        - Sridhara
          - Bhudhara
          - Gadadhara
            - Rajyadhara (Cooch Behar)
              - Arya Sridhara (Samantapradhana at Kamrupa)
                - Dharadhara (also known as Lakshmikara Thakur)
                  - Sulapani (also known as Bangsadhara Thakur)
                    - Pinakapani
                      - Tankapani
                        - Ratnapani
                          - Narasimha Das (also known as Narahari Das, Naradev Das, and Naradasa Thakur, contemporary of Sena Emperor Ballal Sena)
                            - Mahasamanta Vatudasa
                              - Mahamandalik Shridharadasa
                            - Patudas (childless)
                            - Bhuvanadi
                            - Sridharadas (revered in Barendra society)
                            - Hayagriva
                    - Chakrapani (also known as Bangsadhara Thakur)
                      - Devadhara (also known as Sridhara Thakur, Mantri of Nanyadeva, founder of the Karnat dynasty of Mithila)
