= Ramram Das =

Co-founder of Kadirpara Estate and zamindar

Majumdar Ramram Das Babu Zamindar of Kadirpara Taluqdar of Bilpakuria
- রামরাম দাস
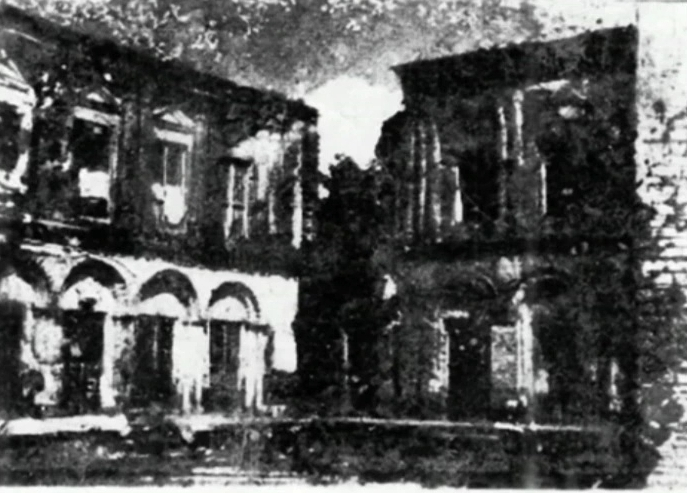
- An old photograph of Kadirpara Babu Zamindar Bari
- Born: 17th century Jahanabad, Bengal Subah, Mughal Empire (now Khulna, Bangladesh)
- Died: Kadirpara Estate, Bengal (now Magura District, Bangladesh)
- Successor: Babu Radhakrishna Munshi
- Children: Babu Radhakrishna Munshi
- Father: Majumdar Rajiv Lochan Das

Ramram Das was one of the earliest patriarchs of the extended Munshi family of Kadirpara and Chougachi, who co-founded the Kadirpara Estate along with his younger brother Munshi Balaram Das. He was the son of Majumdar Rajivlochan Das, younger brother of Hariram Das and elder brother of Munshi Balaram Das. He belonged to the Das family belonging to the Barendra Kayastha lineage, which originated from Mahatma Narahari Das (also known as Naradev Das). Ramram's bravery has been documented in the books Jessore-Khulnar Itihas (English: History of Jessore and Khulna) by Satish Chandra Mitra and Raja Sitaram Ray by Jadunath Bhattacharya. He, along with his younger brother Balaram, once fought off fearsome robbers with immense courage, which impressed Raja Sitaram Ray, helping them be granted with a whole village called Bilpakuria in exchange of no tax. This incident laid the foundation of the zamindari in Kadirpara, later known as the Kadirpara Estate.

== Legacy ==
Satish Chandra Mitra noted in Jessore-Khulnar Itihas that the village Bilpakuria was part of the Belgachi pargana and under the jurisdiction of the Baliakandi Police Station in Faridpur. According to him, this village was listed in the Faridpur Collectorate's revenue register as a kharija taluq in the name of Ramram for more than 200 years and remained in the possession of the Munshis. While his younger brother, Munshi Balaram Das, often regarded as the earliest zamindar of the Kadirpara—died without issue, the succession passed to Ramram's son, Radhakrishna Munshi, who became the next zamindar.

== Family tree ==
- Majumdar Rajiv Lochan Das
  - Hariram Das
    - Premnarayan Munshi
      - Krishnakanta Munshi
        - Sambhunath Munshi
          - Harinath Munshi
  - Ramram Das
    - Radhakrishna Munshi
      - Raghunath Munshi
        - Gabindanath Munshi
          - Gatinath Munshi
            - Tejendra Munshi
            - Hemendra Munshi
          - Chandranath Munshi
            - Jatindranath Munshi
            - Gopendranath Munshi
        - Krishnanath Munshi
          - Dwarakanath Munshi
            - Trailakyanath Munshi
          - Jadunath Munshi
  - Munshi Balaram Das
