= Tankapani Dasa =

Tankapani Dasa, also referred to as Kayastha Tankadasa was a scion of the ancient Barendra Kayastha Das family, which later became famous as the Munshi family since his descendant Munshi Balaram Das was appointed as the court Munshi by Raja Sitaram Ray during 17th century. He was the son of Mankhadasa, the earliest documented patriarch of the Das family, and the father of the 9th century Bengali poet Chakrapani Dasa. According to Nagendranath Basu, his name is mentioned in Tibetan Buddhist text along with his son Chakrapani. Kashidasa has detailed his life in Varendrakaranabarnana. He moved from Rarha to Pataliputra, one of the capitals of the Pala Empire, due to Brahmin intrigue. Tankadasa was appointed as the chief scribe in the royal court of the second Pala Emperor Dharmapala of Bengal.

== Family tree ==
- Mankhadasa
  - Tankapani Dasa
    - Chakrapani Dasa
      - Dhiradasa
      - Suradasa (settled in Barendra)
        - Sridhara
          - Bhudhara
          - Gadadhara
            - Rajyadhara (Cooch Behar)
              - Arya Sridhara (Samantapradhana at Kamrupa)
                - Dharadhara (also known as Lakshmikara Thakur)
                  - Sulapani (also known as Bangsadhara Thakur)
                    - Pinakapani
                      - Tankapani
                        - Ratnapani
                          - Narasimha Das (also known as Narahari Das, Naradev Das, and Naradasa Thakur, contemporary of Sena Emperor Ballal Sena)
                            - Mahasamanta Vatudasa
                              - Mahamandalik Shridharadasa
                            - Patudas (childless)
                            - Bhuvanadi
                            - Sridharadas (revered in Barendra society)
                            - Hayagriva
                    - Chakrapani (also known as Bangsadhara Thakur)
                      - Devadhara (also known as Sridhara Thakur, Mantri of Nanyadeva, founder of the Karnat dynasty of Mithila)
