= Banwari Munshi =

Zamindar of Chougachi (1848 - 1917)

Babu Banwari Munshi Zamindar of Chougachi
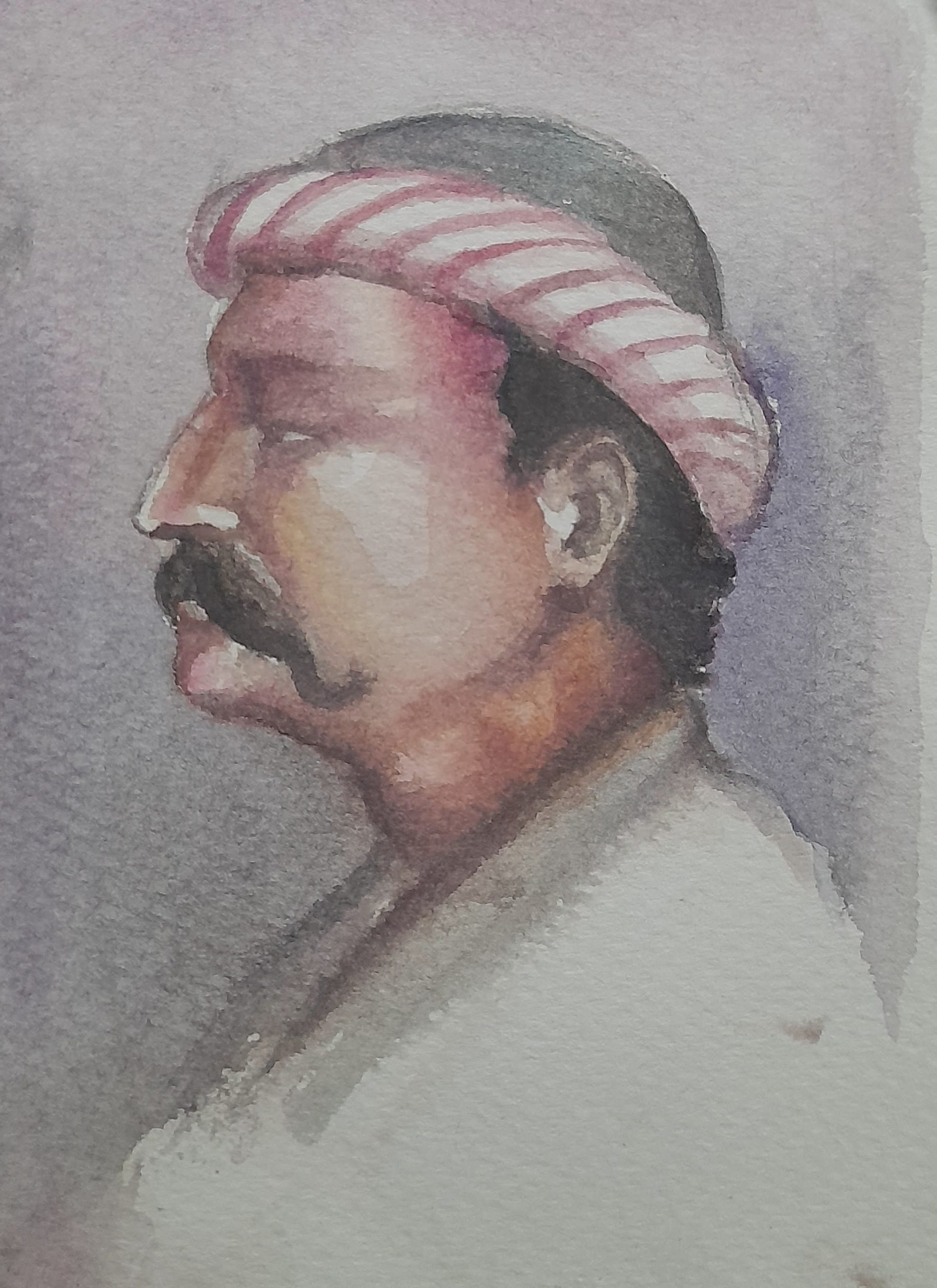
- Portrait attributed to Babu Banwari Charan Munshi
- Born: 1848; Kadirpara Babu Bari, Bengal Presidency, British India (present day Kadirpara Union, Bangladesh)
- Died: 24 June 1917 (aged 68–69); Chougachi Kachari Bari, Bengal Presidency, British India (present day Sreepur Upazila, Magura, Bangladesh)
- Predecessor: Babu Achyut Charan Munshi
- Successor: Babu Amulya Munshi
- Children: Four, including Anukul Munshi and Amulya Munshi
- Father: Babu Hari Charan Munshi

Babu Banwari Charan Munshi (Note: Not to be confused with Bonwari Munshi of Munshibari family of Ulipur.) (Bengali: বনওয়ারীচরণ মুন্সী; 1848 - 24 June 1917) was an Indian Bengali landlord, philanthropist and businessman, who served as the Zamindar of Chougachi. He was widely admired for his gentle demeanor and his spirit of hospitality.

== Life ==
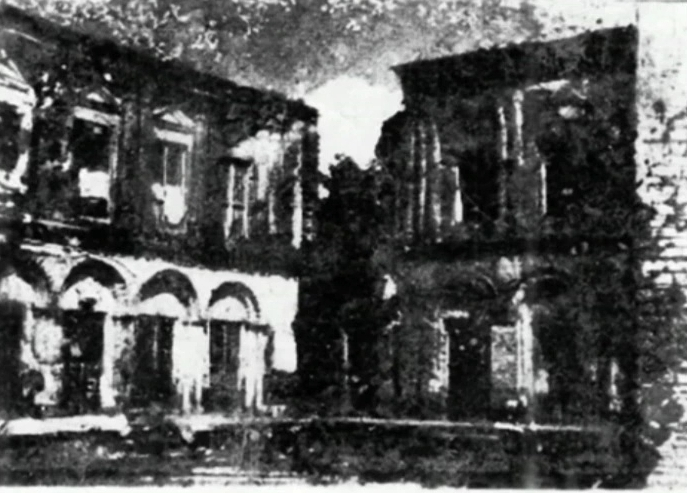
Kadirpara Babu Zamindar Bari, the birthplace of Munshi

Munshi was born in Kadirpara in 1848. He lost his father Babu Hari Charan Munshi at a very young age. From childhood, he displayed a strong sense of responsibility and practical knowledge, particularly in matters of land and property. After the partition of the joint taluq of the Kadirpara Munshis, he assumed the responsibility of caring for his siblings. In 1865, at the age of only seventeen, he left Kadirpara and settled permanently in Chougachi. In this village, his kinsman, Babu Achyut Charan Munshi, served as the Munshi of Mr. Hodgson, the local indigo planter, and later came into possession of vast landed property. Through the individual efforts of Banwari Munshi, the family was able to establish its control over extensive estates in Chougachi. During his tenure, 21 mouzas were incorporated into the estate, each consisting of 3 to 4 villages. He initiated collective farming on his own lands by engaging the local peasants. Because of his affable conduct and cordial nature, he became highly respected and popular among the local community. Guided by the principle “prosper through cultivation”, he personally organized the peasants of Chougachi village to work on his lands. He also attained notable success as an indigo trader, and his indigo factory later came to be known locally as the Kuthibari. His son, Babu Amulya Munshi, subsequently renamed the village of Chougachi as Kuthi Chougachi. His estate manager was Jasimuddin. During Munshi's lifetime, no inhabitant of the village reportedly suffered from a shortage of food or clothing. Whenever he heard of anyone lacking garments, he instructed Jasimuddin to provide clothing from the estate. In order to promote education in the locality, he entrusted his eldest son, Babu Anukul Munshi (who later gained recognition as a mother-of-pearl artist) with the responsibility of establishing a primary school on land adjacent to the family residence. However, the school did not remain in operation for long. Later, Amulya Munshi established the first ever school in his memory in the village of Chougachi. Munshi was the grandfather of the Indian commercial artist Annada Munsi and mother-of-pearl artist Manu Munsi. He played significant role for the early education of Annada Munsi. Munshi died on 24 June 1917 at the Chougachi Kachari Bari.

== Legacy ==
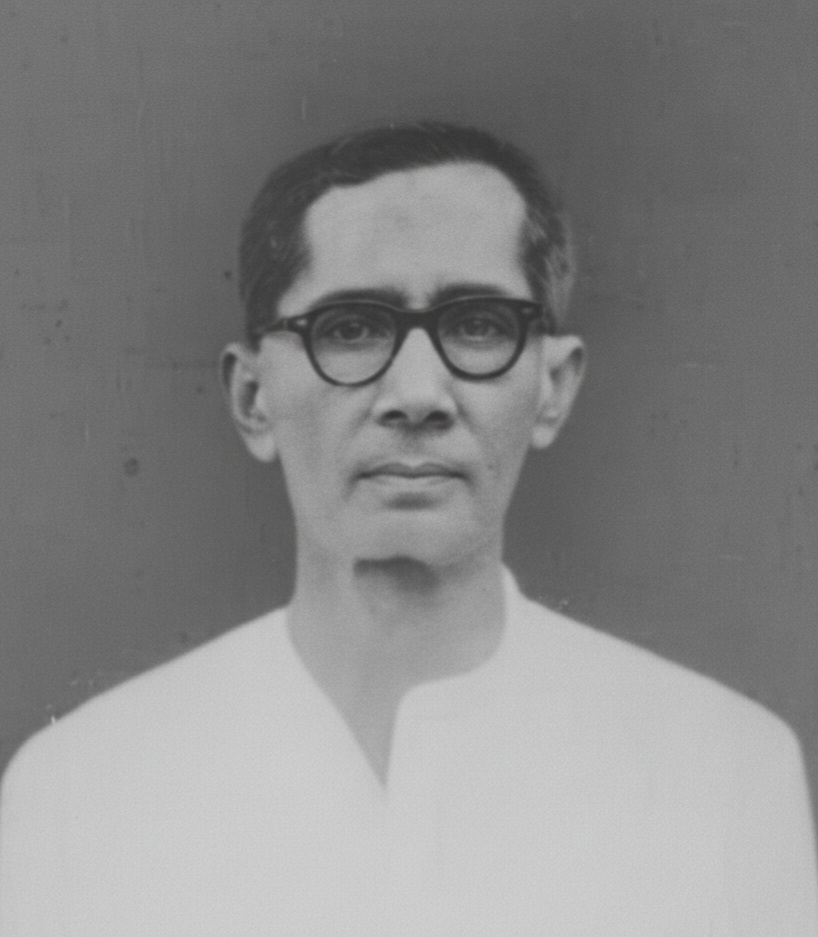
Babu Amulya Munshi, son of Banwari Munshi

To his legacy, his son Amulya Munshi later established a school in Chougachi in 1936, named the Banwari Charan Memorial M.E. School, believing that without it, both Hindu and Muslim communities could not be free from ignorance. Prior to its establishment, there was no formal school in Chougachi with primary aim to promote education. The school's name was subsequently changed to the Pupils’ Academy of Chougachi (also known as the Chougachi B.M. Pupils’ Academy). Babu Prithvis Chandra Munshi served as the school's headmaster. The school continued to operate successfully until 1947; however, following the Partition of India and the departure of the zamindar family to Calcutta, it suffered from a lack of sufficient support and was ultimately closed in 1954. Despite this closure, the local community remained committed to promoting education. In 1966, villagers took the initiative to establish a new institution, which was recognized from its inception as a secondary school and began functioning as Chougachi High School. In 2014, the school gained recognition under the Secondary Education Quality and Access Enhancement Project (SEQAEP) of the Ministry of Education (Bangladesh), and in 2016, it was honoured as the best school in Sreepur Upazila, Magura during National Education Week. His life and works were published in the book Munshianany Chollis Purush edited by Santanu Ghosh, which primarily focuses on the contributions and achievements of the Munshis in various fields. A review of the book was published in Anandabazar Patrika in 2016.

Students at the playground of Chougachi High School
