= Amulya Munshi =

Zamindar of Chougachi (1904–1984)

Babu Amulya Munshi Zamindar of Chougachi
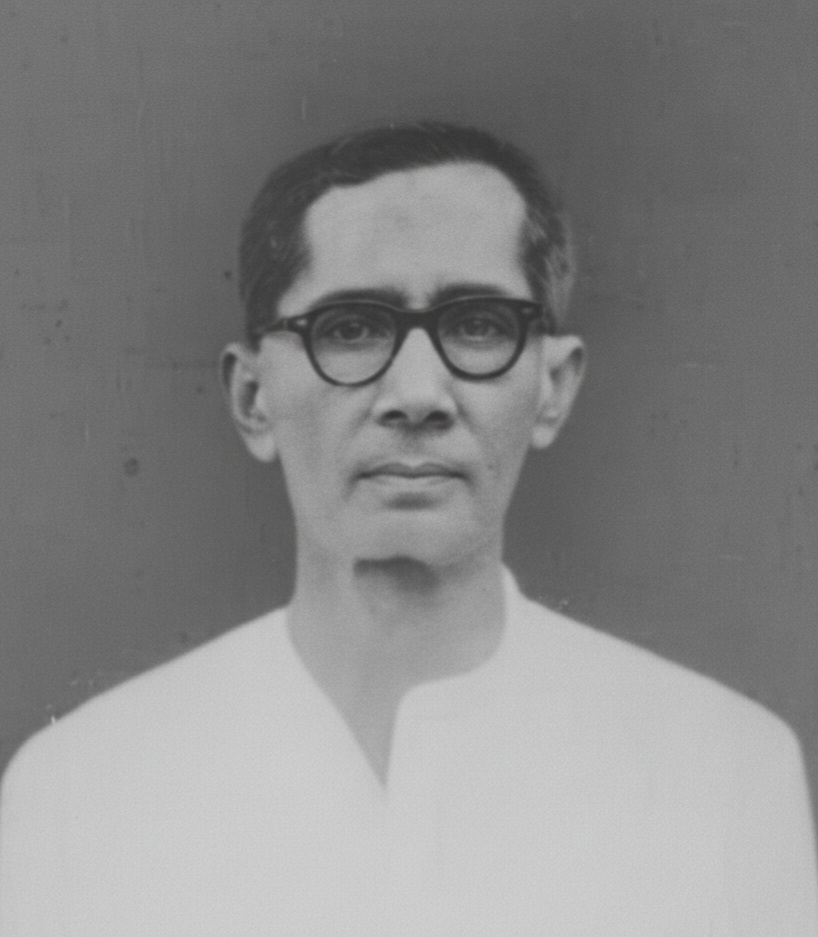
- Babu Amulya Munshi of Chougachi
- Born: 1904; Chougachi Babu Bari, Bengal Presidency, British India (present day Sreepur Upazila, Magura, Bangladesh)
- Died: 15 January 1984 (aged 79–80); Belgharia, West Bengal, India
- Predecessor: Babu Banwari Charan Munshi
- Successor: Position abolished
- Children: Five sons and five daughters
- Father: Babu Banwari Charan Munshi

Amulya Charan Munshi (Bengali: অমূল্য চরণ মুন্সী; 1904 – 15 January 1984) was a Bengali zamindar, philanthropist, social reformer and patron of music. He was the last zamindar of Chougachi.

== Early life ==
Munshi was a member of the extended Munshi family of Kadirpara and Chougachi, and was born to Babu Banwari Charan Munshi at Chougachi of Bengal Presidency (present day Magura District, Bangladesh). While studying in Berhampore College, he suddenly dropped out in the midst of his course and came back to Chougachi. Later, he was appointed as the Common Manager to his paternal uncle Babu Lalit Mohan Munshi for assisting him in the estate administration. Munshi gradually became an efficient administrator of the estate. In 1930, following the retirement of Lalit Mohan, Amulya Munshi assumed full-time responsibility for managing the estate as the succeeding representative of his father.

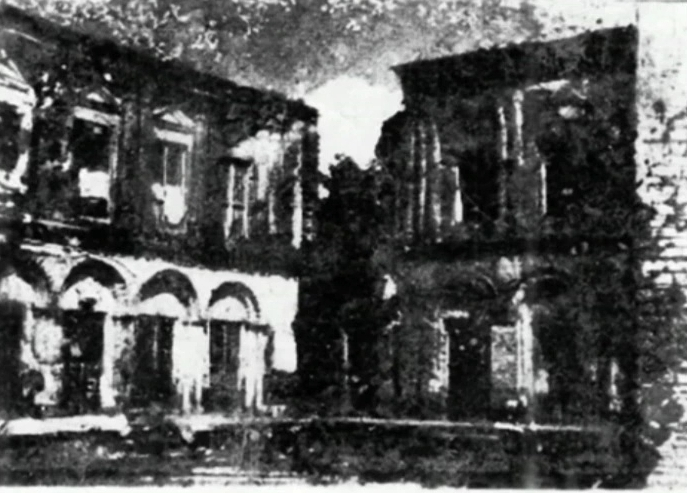
Kadirpara Babu Zamindar Bari, the ancestral house of Munshi

== Career ==
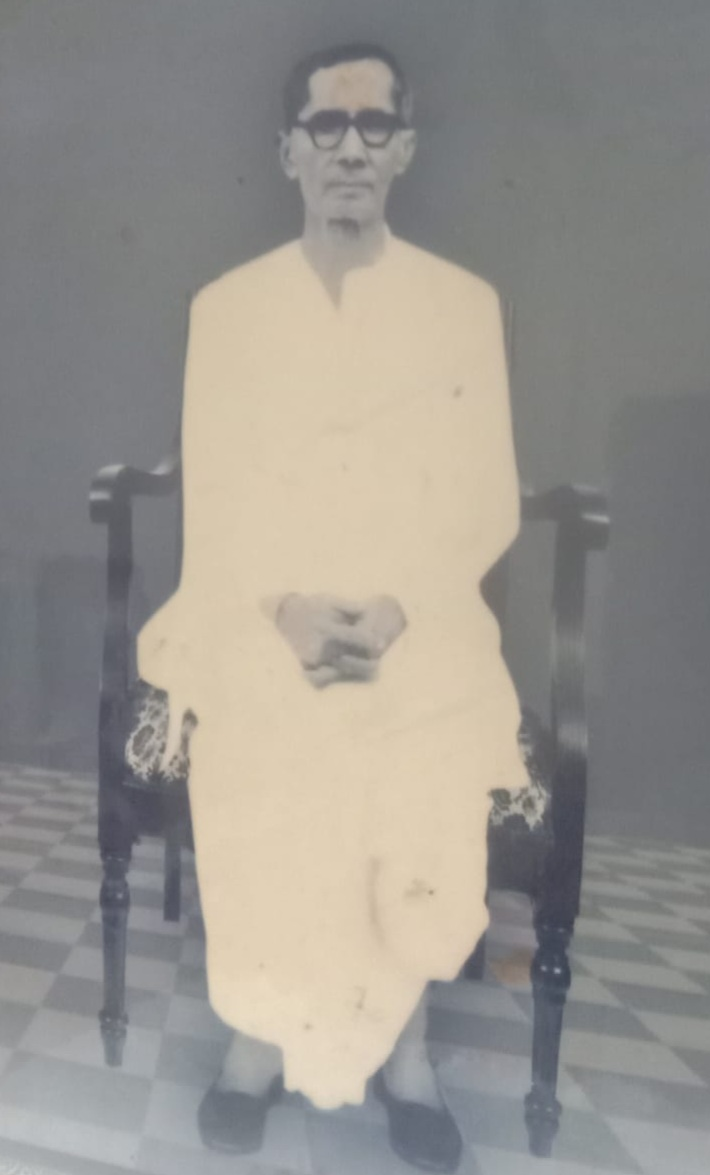
Munshi at Belghoria during 1970s

=== Sreepur Sanskritik Parishad ===
Munshi worked consistently for the welfare of Chougachi village. Recognizing the importance of communal harmony, he established the Sreepur Sanskritik Parishad to promote cultural exchange between Hindus and Muslims. The council included members from Hindu, Muslim and Namasudra communities. The council held annual conferences and various cultural programs, including poetry recitals and discussions on education. Regular literary meetings and discussions on social development were organized each year. Distinguished individuals were recognized and honored for their contributions. The inauguration of the council was presided over by journalist Manoj Basu of Amrita Bazar Patrika. Local families, including the Laha and Raha families, supported Munshi and contributed to the council's activities in various ways. Munshi also envisioned to establish a community rice storage system modeled on an agricultural cooperative, intended to assist the public during periods of low production or flood-related crop loss. The initiative was not ultimately successful.

=== Restoration of Hanu River of Sreepur ===
A significant contribution of his life was the restoration of the Hanu River in Sreepur, which had become heavily silted. The project began in 1942–43, with financial and logistical support from M. N. Khan, the then District Magistrate of Jessore. The restoration made several hundred acres of land arable, benefited local farmers and reduced flooding during the monsoon. Although the restoration of the Hanu River in 1942-43 temporarily improved agricultural productivity and reduced flooding, the river has become silted again in present days.

=== Service during famine of Bengal, 1943 ===
During the Bengal famine of 1943, Munshi's efforts in Chougachi were reported to have prevented any deaths in the village. His work was recognized by Lord Casey, then Governor of Bengal, who presented him with a clock manufactured by Cooke and Kelvey.

=== Patronage of music ===
Munshi was also a music-lover by nature with a good voice of singing. At the Chougachi Babu Bari he often used to organize musical gatherings, which was attended by noted Hindustani Classical vocalist Chinmoy Lahiri and renowned singer Mintoo Dasgupta. Munshi himself was also a regular performer of the songs composed by Atul Prasad Sen.

=== Contribution in education ===
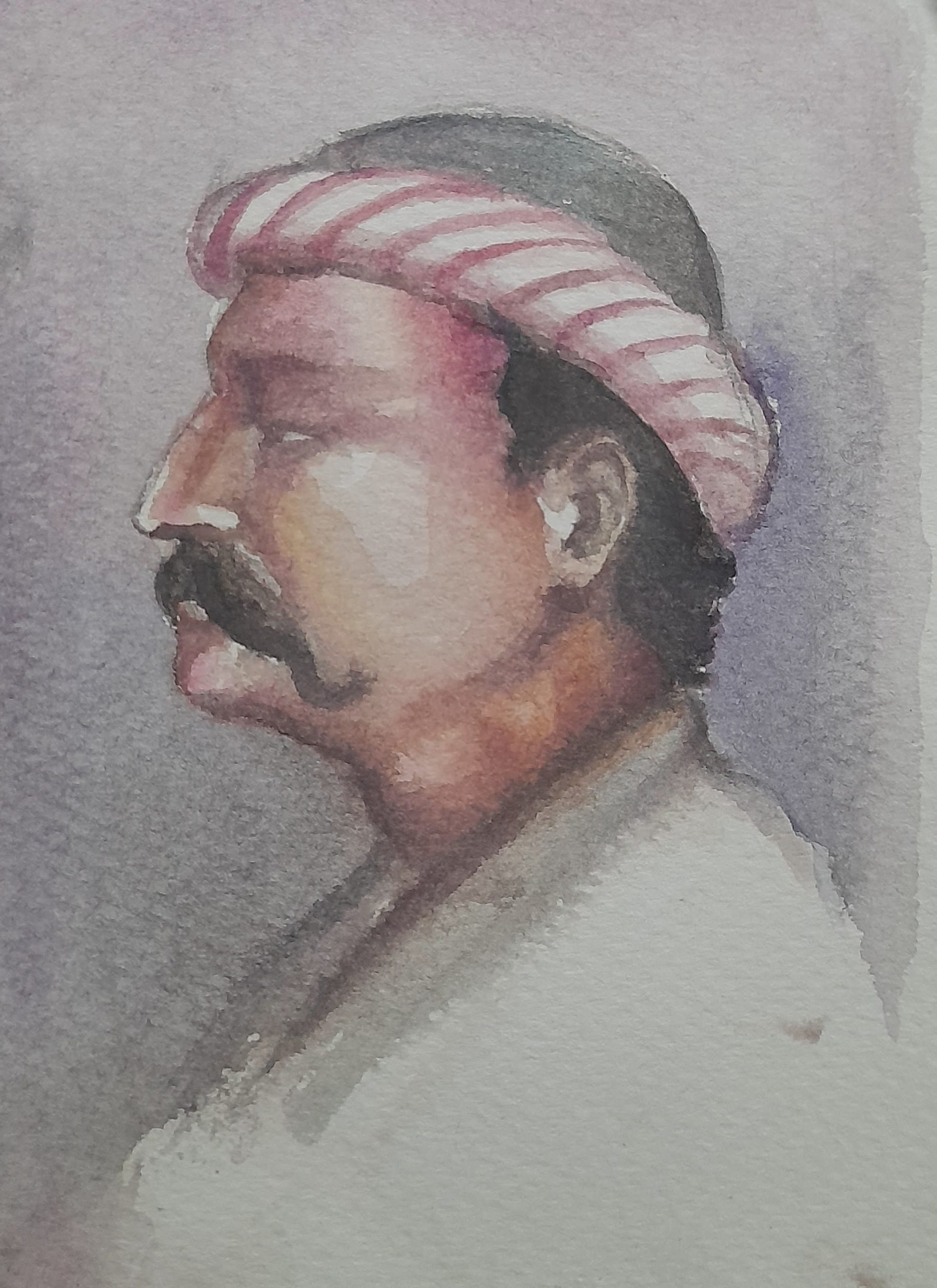
Portrait attributed to Babu Banwari Munshi, father of Amulya Munshi

To honour his father Banwari Charan's wishes, Munshi established a school in Chougachi in 1936, named the Banwari Charan Memorial M.E. School. Prior to its establishment, there was no school in Chougachi. Munshi's primary aim was to promote education, believing that without it, both Hindu and Muslim communities could not be free from ignorance. The school's name was later changed to the Pupils’ Academy of Chougachi (also known as the Chougachi B.M. Pupils’ Academy). Babu Prithvis Chandra Munshi served as the school's headmaster. The school operated successfully until 1947; however, following the Partition of India and the departure of the zamindar family to Calcutta, it lacked adequate patronage and was completely closed in 1954. Despite the closure, the local community's commitment to education remained strong. In 1966, through the initiative of the villagers, a new educational institution was established, recognized from the outset as a secondary school, and began functioning as Chougachi Secondary School. In 2014, the school received recognition under the Secondary Education Quality and Access Enhancement Project (SEQAEP) of the Ministry of Education (Bangladesh), and in 2016, it was awarded as the best school in Sreepur Upazila, Magura during National Education Week.

Students at the playground of Chougachi High School

=== Other social activities ===
Munshi financially supported Jessore-Khulna Seva Samity for the service to the general public, when Jessore and Khulna were afflicted by flood. He also established the post office called 'Kuthi Chougachi'.

== Personal life ==
Munshi married Binapani Devi in 1924. The couple had five sons and five daughters. Their eldest son, Atulya Charan Munshi, was a physician and an alumnus of Calcutta National Medical College. According to an essay published in Bdnews24.com, which was written by noted author and journalist Mir Waliuzzaman, post-partition, when he was set to settle with family in Calcutta, he handed over all his rights to the estate to his friend and estate manager Kazi Ansaruddin Ahmad, in exchange of a fair payment. His detailed biography has been published in the book Munshianany Chollis Purush edited by Santanu Ghosh, which was focused on the long-standing contributions and achievements of the members of the Munshi family. The book had been discussed in a review published by Anandabazar Patrika in 2016.
