= Munshibari family of Ulipur =

Feudal estate in Bengal

Munshibari
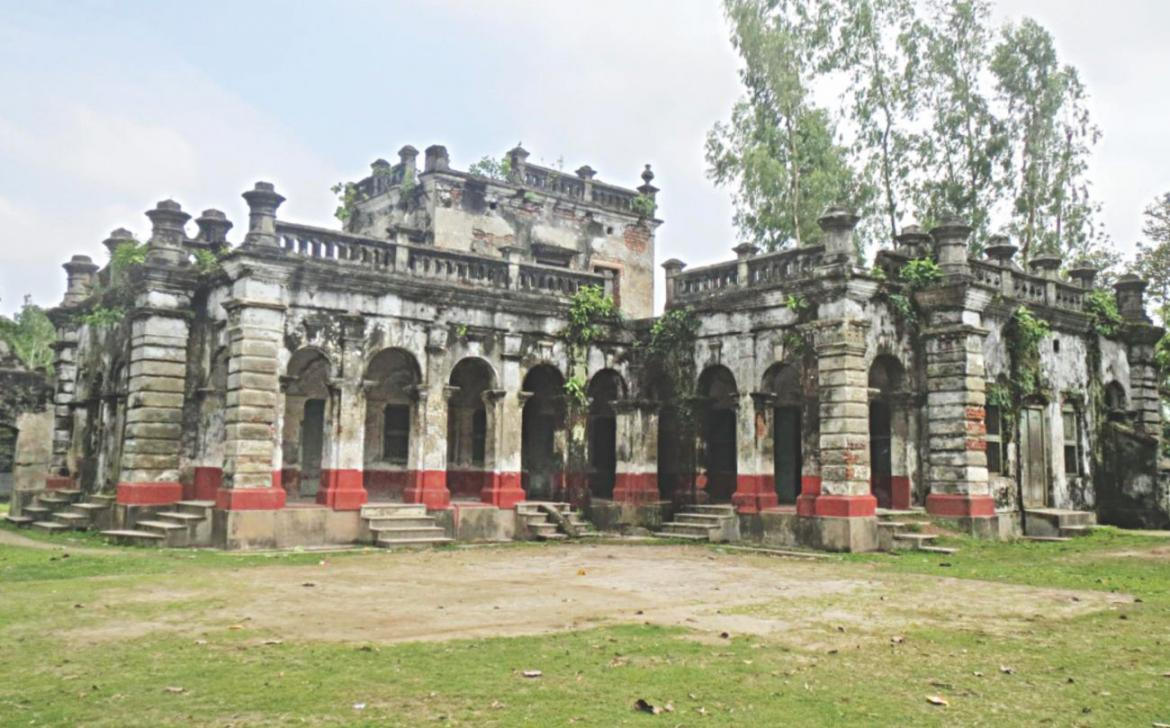
- Residence of the Munshibari family located on the outskirts of Ulipur town in Kurigram District, Bangladesh.
- Alternative names: Ulipur Munshibari

General information
- Status: Endangered
- Type: Two-storey building
- Architectural style: Mughal and European architecture
- Location: Dharanibari, Ulipur, Kurigram, Bangladesh
- Coordinates: 25.675105°N 89.628335°E
- Completed: 1880
- Owner: Department of Archaeology, Bangladesh

Technical details
- Floor count: 2

The Munshibari was a feudal estate in Kurigram District in the Division of Rangpur, Bengal (present day Bangladesh). It was founded in the mid-18th century by an official of the Rulers of Bengal.

== History ==
During the period of Brojendra Lal Munshi, a custodian was chosen named Kanai Lal Sarkar. According to him, during the reign of Nawab Shirajuddaula, the sixth Nawab of Bengal, Bihar and Orissa of the Afshar Dynasty, Bonwari Munshi (Note: Not to be confused with Banwari Munshi of Chougachi Estate.) had an employee under the latter, with the title of Munshi.

Bonwari Munshi once had come for hunting to the area of Dharnibari Union by river over the Bamnee. He liked the land and suggested this to the Nawab and requested some for himself, receiving 21.20 acres of land for himself and a further 11.20 acres for Laxmi Narayan. The family hence established the estate with around 34 acres of land under Bonwari Munshi and Laxmi Narayan.

The Islamic Mission and Foundation had taken 7.42 acres of land that had been adjoining the building for almost a century under the Government. There, a hospital and a mosque had been set up for the local people. In addition, some land had been given to local people on an annual lease.

=== Family ===
It is said that Bonawari Munshi never had a child which is why, his wife Kadinginee Munshi adopted a son, named Binod to serve the estate's founder, Laxmi Narayan. Binod, as it turned out, was also without an heir. His wife Krishna Kaminee adopted another son called Brojendra Lal for the same cause. Finally, Brojendra Lal Munshi's wife, Asharatha Munshi gave birth to two daughters. The oldest named Shuchi Rani and younger was called Shushama. The latter died young.

Sachi Rani was married off in Kushtia, her family later left to live in Kolkata. Her child named as Sushamakanti who along with his family lives in Kolkata. Shachis mother Asalata then adopted a male child for inheriting the estate. After the Bangladesh Liberation War, Bihari Lal Munshi the incumbent head of the family went to Kolkata giving the responsibility of taking care of the Munshi Bari to a local named Saifur Mia, who allegedly handed over the Munshibari to one Arif Mia.

=== Dissolution and government takeover ===
Conflict arose among the locals when the caretaker, Arif Mia tried take over the estate. Arif Mia fired his gun and two local students were shot and killed, one of them dying instantly while the other succumbed to his wounds. A case was then filed, and subsequently dismissed.

The Government of Bangladesh then took control of the Munshibari along with all its property. In 1987, the Revenue Office of Dharnibari was placed within the estate where they still operate.

== Legacy ==
The ruins of the estate consist of the Nat Mondir or a play house, Durga temple, Biswanu temple, the dining room and kitchen. There is also the Gobinda Mondir, the drawing room, bedrooms, rest room in the upper floor, bathrooms and Shiva temple. The people of the locality have been using the pond in the premises for uses while the other portions are being used by the Government of Bangladesh as offices.

Every year Durga Mela is also held within the Munshibari grounds.

== Related houses ==
The Munshibari of Calcutta, is, according to the book Baranagar: Itihas O Samikshya by Anup Motilal and Ranjankumar Bandopadhyay, had its origins in the days of Warren Hastings (1732 – 1818). Constructed in 1855, the building had been turned into a Retirement home.
