= Munshi Balaram Das =

First zamindar of Kadirpara

First Babu zamindar of Kadirpara Munshi Balaram Das
- মুন্সী বলরাম দাস
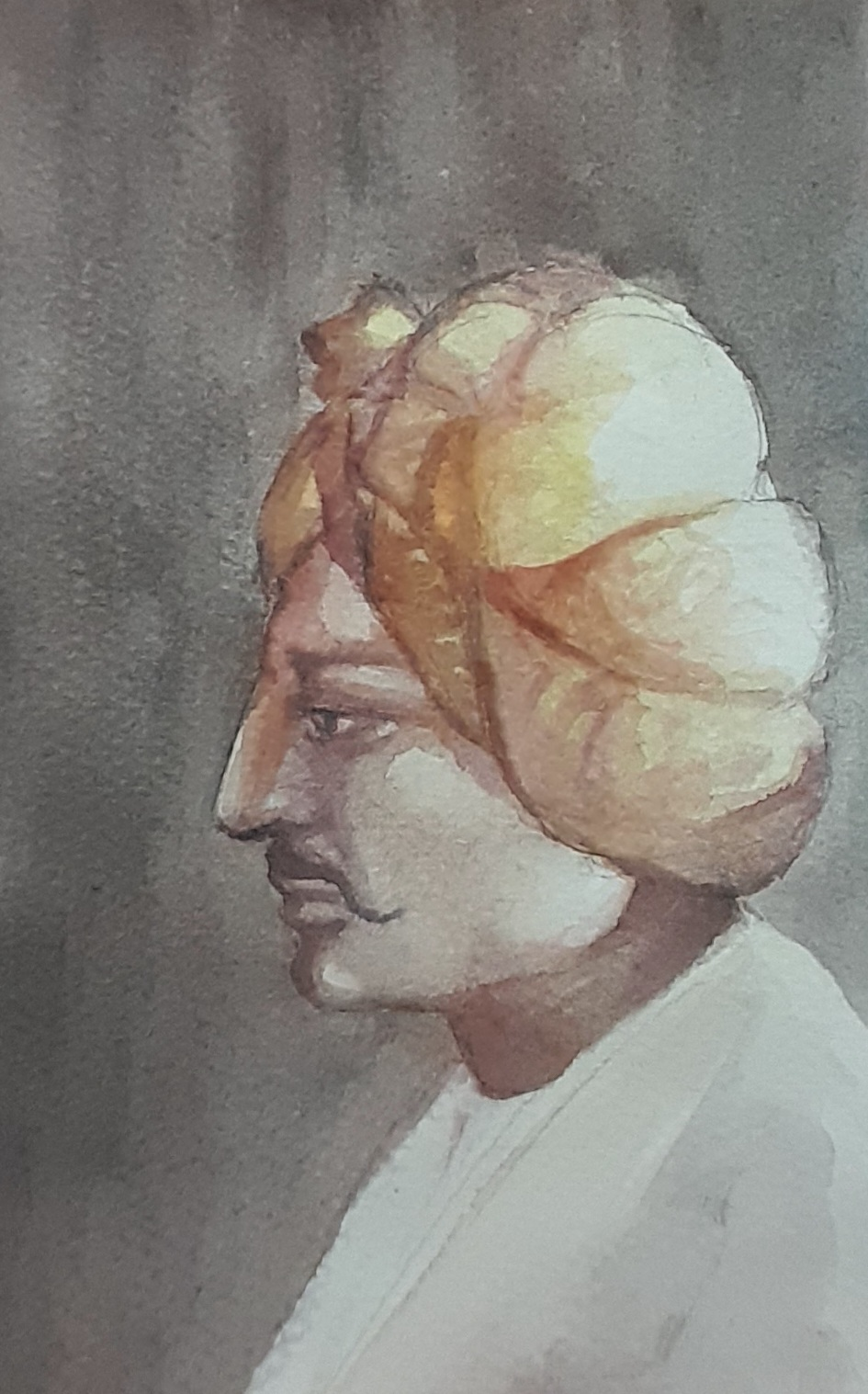
- Portrait attributed to Munshi Balaram Das
- Born: 17th century Jahanabad, Bengal Subah, Mughal Empire (now Khulna, Bangladesh)
- Died: Kadirpara Estate, Bengal (now Magura District, Bangladesh)
- Successor: Babu Radhakrishna Munshi
- Children: Childless
- Father: Majumdar Rajiv Lochan Das

Munshi Balaram Das (Bengali: মুন্সি বলরাম দাস, c. 17th century) was a Bengali aristocrat and zamindar who founded the Kadirpara Estate. He served as the Munshi of Raja Sitaram Ray, the 17th century independent Hindu monarch who revolted against Mughal Empire.

== Background ==
Satish Chandra Mitra, in his book History of Jessore-Khulna (Bengali: Jashor Khulnar Itihash), has mentioned that Munshi Balaram Das belonged to the 17th century aristocratic Das family, which settled in Shailkupa, along with Nandy and Chaki families, upon a conflict of Tilak Karkat and Jatadhar Nag with Ballal Sena of Sena Dynasty, establishing their own state. Some accounts also mentioned that Munshi Balaram himself established the Shailkupa state. The Dases belonged to Barendra Kayastha clan. Several accounts stated Mahatma Narasimha Das, a contemporary noble man during Ballal Sena's reign, to be the progenitor of the Dases, who belonged to the Barendra Kayastha clan. After ceaseless wars, his descendants finally settled at Shailkupa, having a fortune to devote themselves in the service of Shri Shri Ram Gopal (deities once served by an ascetic) building a shrine dedicated to them.

== Family ==
The first individual from Das family to settle in Kadirpara was Majumdar Rajivlochan Das, who used to carry the hereditary Majumdar title conferred to the Dases by the Nawab administration. Rajivlochan had three sons named Hariram, Ramram and Balaram, respectively. All the three siblings used to possess high intellect and mighty personality, which grabbed attention of Raja Sitaram Ray. The ancestors of Balaram were conferred with the titles like Rai, Rai-Raiyan, and Sarkar apart from Majumdar for their roles in society. The Dases, upon ceaseless joint attacks by Arakanese and Portuguese pirates, moved from Shailkupa to Dariapur, followed by Kadirpara.

== Rise to power ==
According to Satish Chandra Mitra, Balaram along with his sibling Ramram once fought off fearsome robbers with immense courage. Raja Sitaram Ray, impressed with their courage, granted the siblings a whole village called Bilpakuria in exchange of no tax. The Raja appointed Balaram as Munshi in his court, and since then his descendants carry the hereditary title across generations. As a result of his rise to power, Munshi Balaram accumulated vast wealth in Kadirpara, which ultimately led to the establishment of the Kadirpara Estate.

== Kadirpara Estate ==
Kadirpara Estate was founded by Munshi Balaram at Kadirpara during 17th century. Balaram Das, being childless, was succeeded by his sibling Ramram's son Radhakrishna. The remains of the zamindari palace, commonly referred to as Kadirpara Babu Zamindar Bari, still stand today. It is a notable site of interest in the Magura District of present-day Bangladesh.

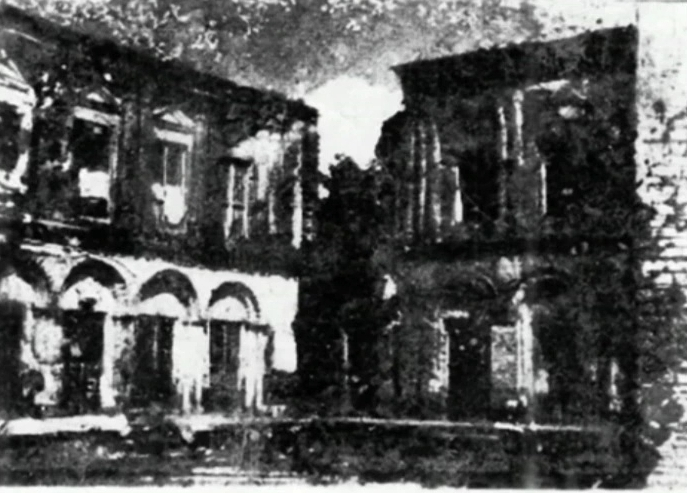
An old photograph of Kadirpara Babu Zamindar Bari

== Family tree ==
- Majumdar Rajiv Lochan Das
  - Hariram Das
    - Premnarayan Munshi
      - Krishnakanta Munshi
        - Sambhunath Munshi
          - Harinath Munshi
  - Ramram Das
    - Radhakrishna Munshi
      - Raghunath Munshi
        - Gabindanath Munshi
          - Gatinath Munshi
            - Tejendra Munshi
            - Hemendra Munshi
          - Chandranath Munshi
            - Jatindranath Munshi
            - Gopendranath Munshi
        - Krishnanath Munshi
          - Dwarakanath Munshi
            - Trailakyanath Munshi
          - Jadunath Munshi
  - Munshi Balaram Das (childless, succeeded by Ramram's son Radhakrishna)
