= Janab Ali Majumdar =

Bengali politician

Moulvi Janab Ali Majumdar
- জনাব আলী মজুমদার

Member of the Bengal Legislative Assembly
- In office 1937–1947
- Constituency: Chandpur East

Personal details
- Born: Chandpur, Tipperah District, Bengal Presidency
- Party: Krishak Praja Party

Muhammad Janab Ali Majumdar (Bengali: মহম্মদ জনাব আলী মজুমদার) was a Bengali politician. He served as a member of the Bengal Legislative Assembly.

== Early life ==
He was born into a Bengali Muslim family of Majumdars from Chandpur, which was then under the Tipperah (Comilla) District of the Bengal Presidency.

== Career ==
Majumdar contested in the 1937 Bengal legislative elections, winning in the Chandpur East constituency. In August 1937 however, he was among the 21 members that defected from the leadership of prime minister A. K. Fazlul Huq and his Krishak Praja Party. He was re-elected for a second term following the 1946 elections.
