= Harendranath Munshi =

Indian revolutionary

Shaheed Harendranath Munshi
- হরেন্দ্রনাথ মুন্সী
- Born: 1914; Kadirpara Babu Bari, Bengal Presidency, British India
- Died: 30 January 1938; Dhaka Central Jail, Dacca, British India (present day Dhaka, Bangladesh)
- Cause of death: Force-feeding
- Education: Rajshahi College
- Organization: Indian National Congress
- Known for: Indian independence movement
- Parent: Babu Tejendranath Munshi (father)
- Relatives: Extended Munshi family of Kadirpara and Chougachi

Harendranath Munshi (Bengali: হরেন্দ্রনাথ মুন্সী, 1914 - 30 January 1938), also known as Haren Munshi, was an Indian revolutionary and freedom fighter involved in the Indian independence movement during 1930s.

== Background ==
Munshi was born in 1914. He was a member of the extended Munshi family of Kadirpara and Chougachi of erstwhile Jessore in British India (present day Bangladesh).He lost his mother in early childhood and was brought up under the care and affection of his father, Babu Tejendranath Munshi, and his grandfather, Babu Gatinath Munshi. He initially enrolled at the local Nakol High English School. In 1931, he passed the matriculation examination from Magura School in the first division. He subsequently completed his Intermediate of Science (I.Sc.) from Rajshahi College. While pursuing his B.Sc. studies, he became involved in the Titagarh conspiracy case and was subsequently imprisoned in Dhaka Central Jail.

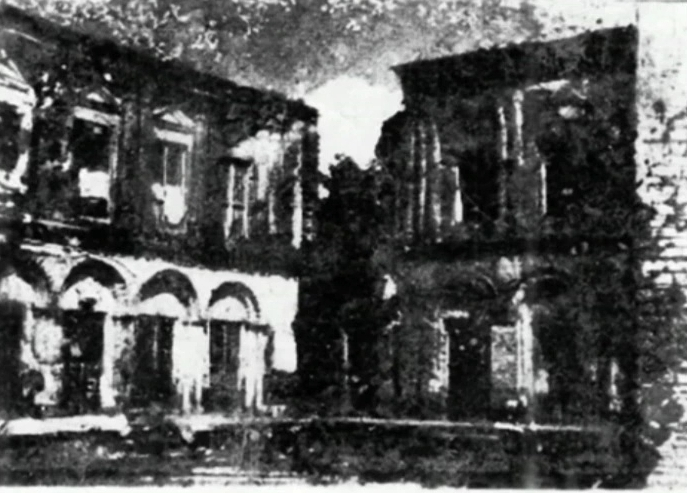
Kadirpara Babu Zamindar Bari, the birthplace of Munshi

== Revolutionary activities ==
As a revolutionary, Munshi was active in ample revolutionary activities. In 1934, he was sentenced to 5 years of rigorous imprisonment in the Titagarh conspiracy case, also known as inter-provincial conspiracy case, and he was first transferred to Diamond Harbour and later to Dhaka Central Jail. In the Dhaka Central Jail he started fatal hunger strike since 21 January 1938, to exhibit his protest against inhuman treatments with the political prisoners and their classification as criminals.

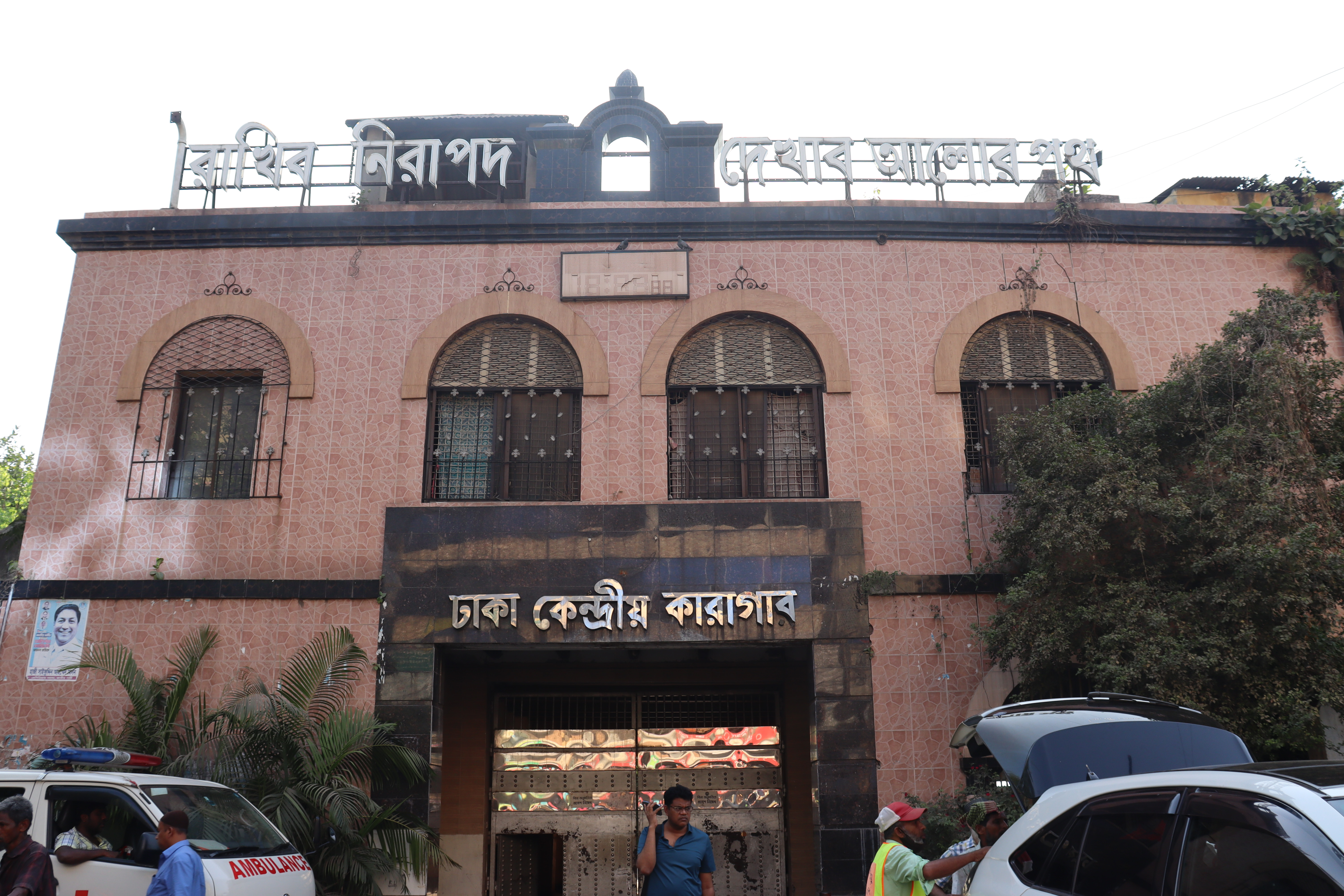
Dacca Central Jail, where Munshi was confined and passed away on January 30, 1938 while resisting force feeding

== Titagarh conspiracy case ==
Munshi was one of the prominent accused in the Titagarh Conspiracy Case, a major sedition trial that originated from a police raid on a revolutionary hideout in the Titagarh area, near Calcutta. The raid, conducted in the early 1930s, uncovered a substantial cache of incriminating materials, including explosives such as sulfuric acid, nitric acid, potassium nitrate, and charcoal; bomb-making equipment; and revolutionary literatures, including books on military training like Infantry Training, Field Gunnery, and Machine Gunners Hand Book. Consequently, 29 individuals were arrested and charged with conspiracy to wage war against the British Crown.

The accused in the Titagarh Conspiracy Case included a diverse group of revolutionaries from across Bengal. The list of those implicated comprised Purnananda Dasgupta (also known as "Buroda"), Shyamananda Palchoudhuri, Niranjan Ghoshal, Sitanath De, Ajit Majumdar, Jiban Dhupi, Dinesh Bhattacharya, Jagadish Chandra Ghatak, Srimati Parul Mukherjee, Santosh Kumar Sen, Bijoy Krishna Pal, and Harendranath Munshi himself, among others. Two of the accused, Santosh Kumar Sen and Bijoy Krishna Pal, were granted pardon and turned approvers (crown witnesses), testifying for the prosecution.

The trial commenced before a Special Tribunal. The prosecution examined 502 witnesses and submitted numerous documents, including the physical evidence seized from the Titagarh den, pamphlets, and handwritten notebooks outlining the organization's objectives. During the trial, approver Santosh Kumar Sen provided extensive testimony about the revolutionary activities of Purnananda Dasgupta and other key figures. After hearing all evidence and arguments, the Special Tribunal delivered its verdict on April 27, 1937. 17 of the 29 accused were convicted under Section 121A of the Indian Penal Code (conspiring to wage war against the King-Emperor) and sentenced to varying terms of rigorous imprisonment. Purnananda Dasgupta and Shyamananda Palchoudhuri were additionally found guilty under the Explosive Substances Act for possessing bomb-making materials. All 17 convicted individuals immediately filed appeals against the Tribunal's decision with the Calcutta High Court. It was while this appeal was pending that Munshi was held in Dhaka Central Jail, where his final protest would unfold.

== Death ==
=== Hunger strike and forcible feeding ===
Munshi commenced his hunger strike on January 21, 1938, joining fellow revolutionary Prafulla Sen who had initiated the fast on January 11. The strike was a protest against the inhuman treatment of political prisoners, their classification as common criminals, and specific local grievances against jail officials in Dhaka Central Jail. Contrary to initial government statements that the demands were purely political, evidence from the subsequent legislative debate and prisoner testimonies pointed to severe local grievances, including brutal disciplinary measures, inadequate medical care, and systematic humiliation by jail staff.

The prison administration responded with force. On January 26 and 27, authorities began forcibly feeding him. A particularly violent instance of this procedure occurred on January 28, when the jail's Medical Officer, Dr. Chaudhuri, attempted to administer food through Munshi's nasal tube. The procedure was severely botched, causing severe damages to Munshi's gums and significant hemorrhaging. Later that day, a non-official jail visitor, Amulya Ratan Guha, the Vice-Chairman of the District Board, found Munshi vomiting and unattended. When Guha sent for a doctor, only a Sub-Assistant Surgeon arrived, who dismissed the vomiting as a temporary side effect of forcible feeding. Munshi's condition deteriorated throughout the night, with no proper medical attention provided. Munshi's condition deteriorated throughout the night, with no proper medical attention provided. He courted martyrdom in the early morning of January 30, 1938, on the tenth day of his fast.

=== Death and aftermath ===
Munshi died on the morning of January 30, 1938, at approximately 6:30 a.m., on the tenth day of his hunger strike in Dhaka Central Jail. His death followed a violent forcible feeding procedure on January 28, during which the jail's medical officer, Dr. Chaudhuri, attempted to administer food through a nasal tube, causing severe damages to Munshi's gums and significant hemorrhaging. The negligence of the jail authorities was starkly highlighted by the correspondence of his uncle, Babu Hemendranath Munshi, presented during the subsequent Bengal Legislative Assembly debate. Hemendranath had written to the Jail Superintendent on January 1 inquiring about his nephew's health and requesting an interview, receiving no reply. He wrote again on January 15 after seeing newspaper reports of a hunger strike, specifically asking, "How is Haren? I have got no information about him?" A reply finally arrived on January 20, stating that Harendra was "doing well" but that he was not permitted to write letters because he had "failed to show proper respect to the Jail Superintendent"—the very day Harendranath began his fatal hunger strike. After learning from a newspaper report of a Legislative Council debate that his nephew was on hunger strike, Hemendranath sent a letter on January 29 pleading with him to end the fast and requesting a personal interview; this letter arrived at the jail on January 30, after Harendranath had already died. The conduct of jail officials following his death drew severe criticism. At 11:30 a.m., Manoranjan Bannerjee received news of the death and contacted non-official visitor Amulya Ratan Guha. When Guha telephoned the Jail Superintendent, the Superintendent claimed to be too busy with the District Magistrate to respond. The Jailer, when asked if any hunger-striker had died, replied that he did not know. Bannerjee and his associates proceeded to the jail gate, where they encountered Dr. Chaudhuri and the Subdivisional Officer, who finally confirmed Munshi's death. When Bannerjee later visited the Jail Superintendent's bungalow to inquire, the Superintendent angrily demanded to know who had informed him of the death, refusing to provide any information until Bannerjee disclosed his source. A non-official visitor's report, entered into the jail's visitor book but never made public, reportedly documented the medical negligence surrounding Munshi's death. On February 9, 1938, Mr. Tulsi Chandra Goswami moved an adjournment motion in the Bengal Legislative Assembly to discuss the matter as one of urgent public importance. Opposition speakers, including Syamaprasad Mookerjee and Manoranjan Bannerjee, criticized the jail authorities for failing to inform the District Magistrate of the hunger strike for over a week, refusing to allow local leaders or relatives to visit the strikers, the brutal forcible feeding that directly led to Munshi's death, the evasive behavior of officials afterward, the complete failure to communicate with the family, and the lack of proper medical attention. In his defense, Home Minister Khwaja Nazimuddin argued that the hunger strike was motivated by broader political demands rather than local grievances, that prisoners had already been granted Division II status, and that encouraging hunger strikes would undermine law and order. Despite the powerful testimony, the adjournment motion was defeated in a vote, with 74 members in favor and 119 against. Meanwhile, the appeal for the Titagarh Conspiracy Case, in which Munshi had been convicted, was heard by the Calcutta High Court on May 9, 1938, which upheld the convictions of the surviving appellants; Munshi's appeal was rendered infructuous by his death.

Kali Charan Ghosh, noted freedom fighter, journalist, lawyer and writer wrote in his book The Roll of Honour: Anecdotes of Indian Martyrs:

“From a very early life Harendra Nath Munshi got himself enlisted in revolutionary organisation and before long was arrested in connection with the Inter-Provincial Conspiracy Case in 1934. He was sentenced to five years’ rigorous imprisonment for conspiracy and transferred to Diamond Harbour Sub-Jail and then to Dacca Central Jail to serve out his sentence.

He resorted to hunger strike on January 21, 1938. The usual practice of nasal feeding went wrong with him, the tube having been misdirected to the windpipe instead to the food. It was the act of a novice who perhaps had not seen it done before. The result was that poor Haren lost his life as a victim of pneumonia on January 30, 1938."

After Munshi's martyrdom, The West Australian and The Sydney Morning Herald covered the news under the title "Young Man's Determined Protest" and "Hunger Striker's Death", respectively.

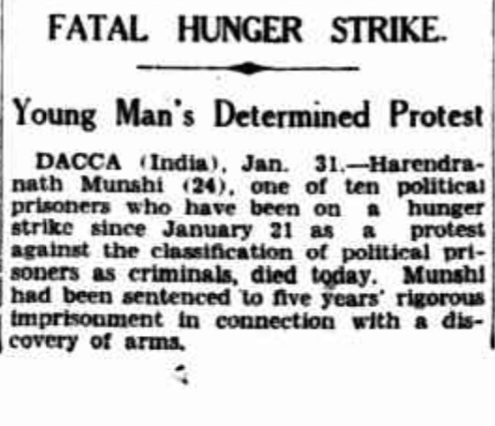
News of martyrdom of Munshi covered by The West Australian on 31 January 1938

Munshi was 24 when he attained martyrdom. Later, Munshi's life was sketched by Santanu Ghosh in his Bengali book Munshianay Chollish Purush, which discussed the contributions of the Munshi family members to the society. A review of the book was published in Anandabazar Patrika in 2016.
