= Munshi =

Title from the Indian subcontinent

During the Mughal Empire, Munshi (Persian: منشی) came to be used as a respected title for persons who achieved mastery over language and politics in the Indian subcontinent.

== Use in Bengal ==
The surname "Munshi" (Bengali: মুন্সি) is used by both Bengali Hindu and Bengali Muslim families in West Bengal, India and in Bangladesh. The surname is commonly associated with former Zamindari families in Bengal from the time of the Nawabs of Bengal in the early 18th-century.

Annada Munshi, Father of commercial art in India, and member of the extended Munshi family of Kadirpara and Chougachi

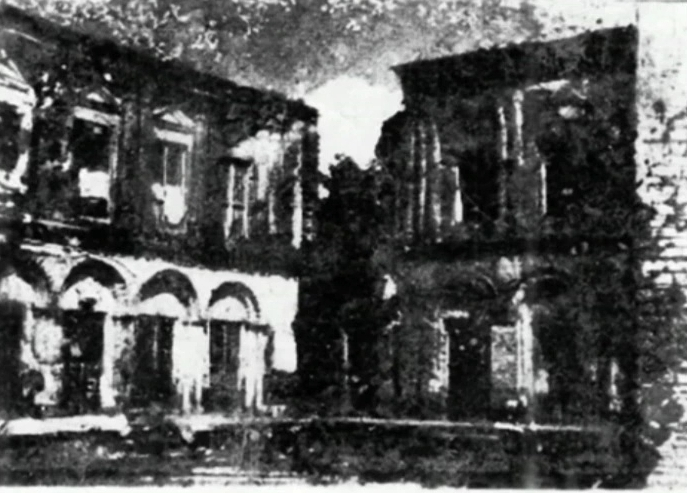
An old photograph of Kadirpara Munshi Bari

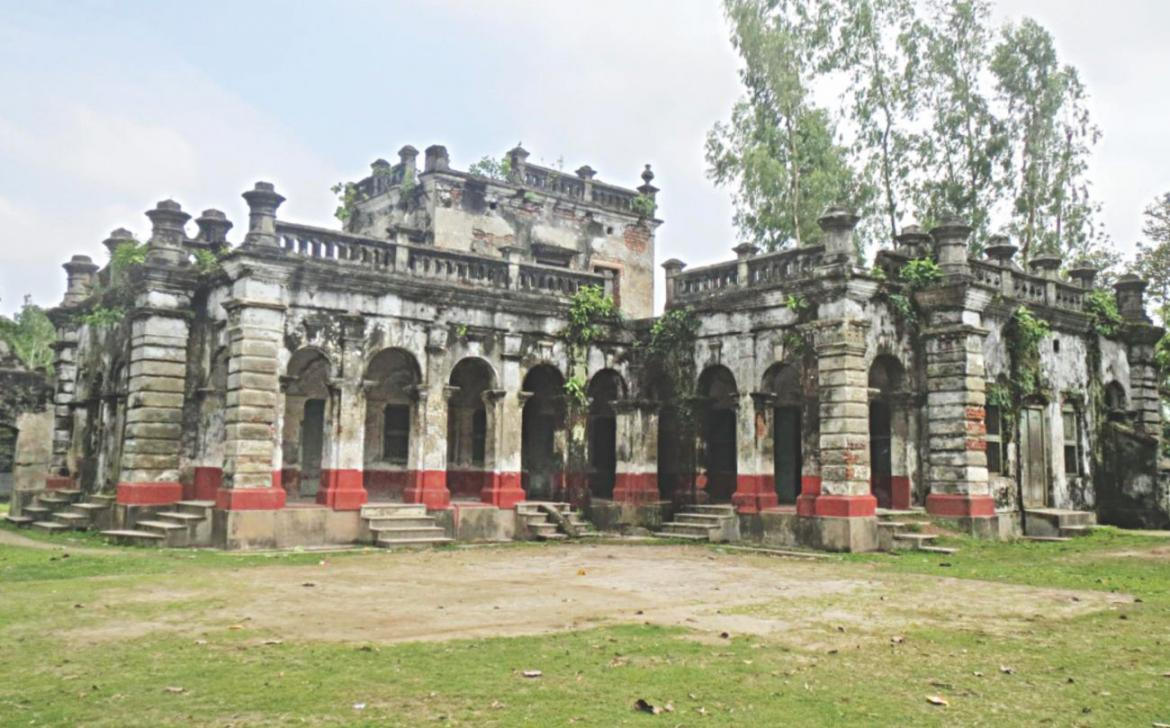
Former estate of Munshibari family of Ulipur in Northern Bangladesh.

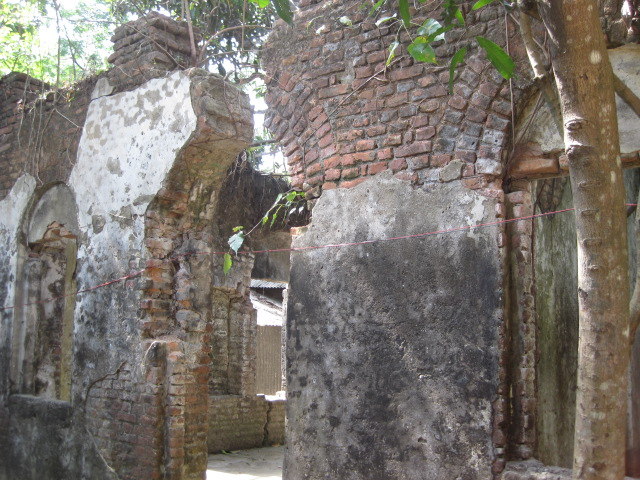
Ruins of the mansion's southern facade of the Munshibari family of Comilla

== Use in Kashmir ==
Munshi is used as a last name by Kashmiri Pandits and Kashmiri Muslims, native to the Kashmir Valley of Jammu and Kashmir, India. It was a title given to some groups of elite upper-caste Hindu Kashmiris for their mastery over the Persian language.

== Notable people ==
- Aditi Munshi (born 1988), Indian singer and politician
- A. F. M. Fakhrul Islam Munshi (1947–2023), Bangladeshi politician
- Amulya Munshi (1904–1984), last zamindar of Chougachi
- Annada Munshi (1905–1985), Father of Commercial Art in India
- Ashfaq Munshi, former CTO of Yahoo
- Aziz A. Munshi, four-term Attorney General of Pakistan
- Banwari Munshi (1848–1917), Zamindar of Chougachi
- Bhagat Munshi Ram (1906–1998), Indian spiritual guru
- Bubu Eklund née Munshi (born 1951), Bengali singer
- Deepa Dasmunsi (born 1960), Indian politician
- Harendranath Munshi (1914–1938), Indian revolutionary
- Hounsh Munshi (born 1993), Indian figure skater
- Ibrahim Munshi (1934–2003), Sindhi-language Poet
- Iskandar Beg Munshi (1561–1633), Iranian historian
- Kanhaiyalal Maneklal Munshi (1887–1971), Indian independence movement activist and politician
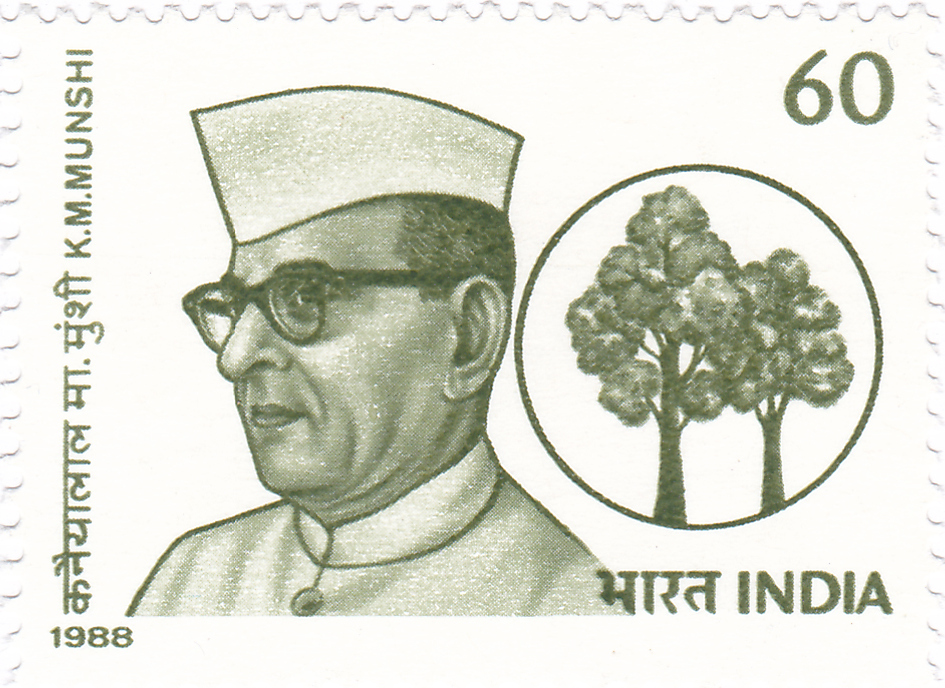
  Kanaiyalal Maneklal Munshi 1988 stamp of India
- Kaumudi Munshi (1929–2020), Indian classical music musician
- Lilavati Munshi (1899–1978), Indian politician
- Mahmudul Haque Munshi (born 1987), Bangladeshi human rights activist
- Manjurul Ahsan Munshi, Bangladeshi politician
- Manu Munsi, (1924–2009) Indian Mother-of-Pearl artist
- Mohit Kumar Munshi, soldier of British Indian Army, aristocrat, author and editor
- Muhammad Sadeq Ali (1798–1862), Bengali district judge and most well-known writer to have used the Sylheti Nagri script
- Munsi Kabir Uddin Ahmed, Bangladeshi Superintendent of Police
- Munshi Abdullah (1796–1854), Malayan writer
- Munshi Abdul Latif, Bangladeshi politician
- Munshi Abdul Majid (born 1952), Afghan politician
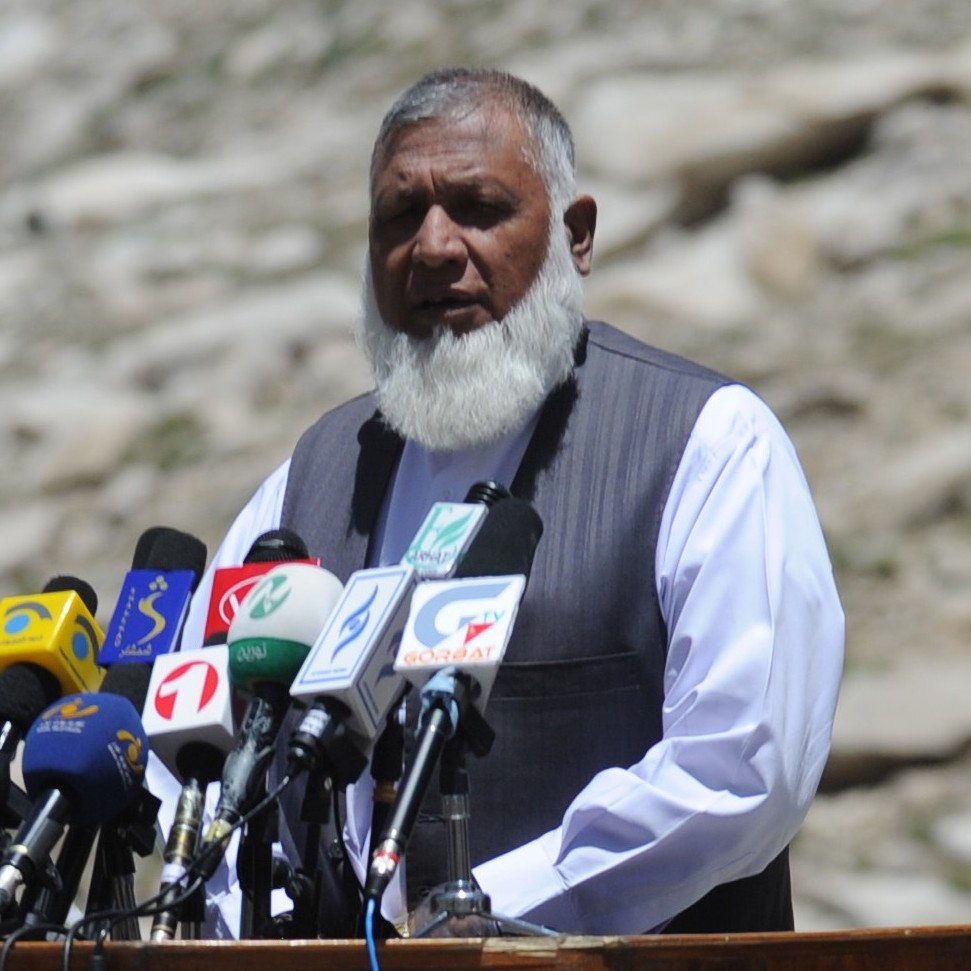
  Munshi Abdul Majid, Afghan politician
- Munshi Abdul Karim (1863–1909), the Indian attendant of Queen Victoria

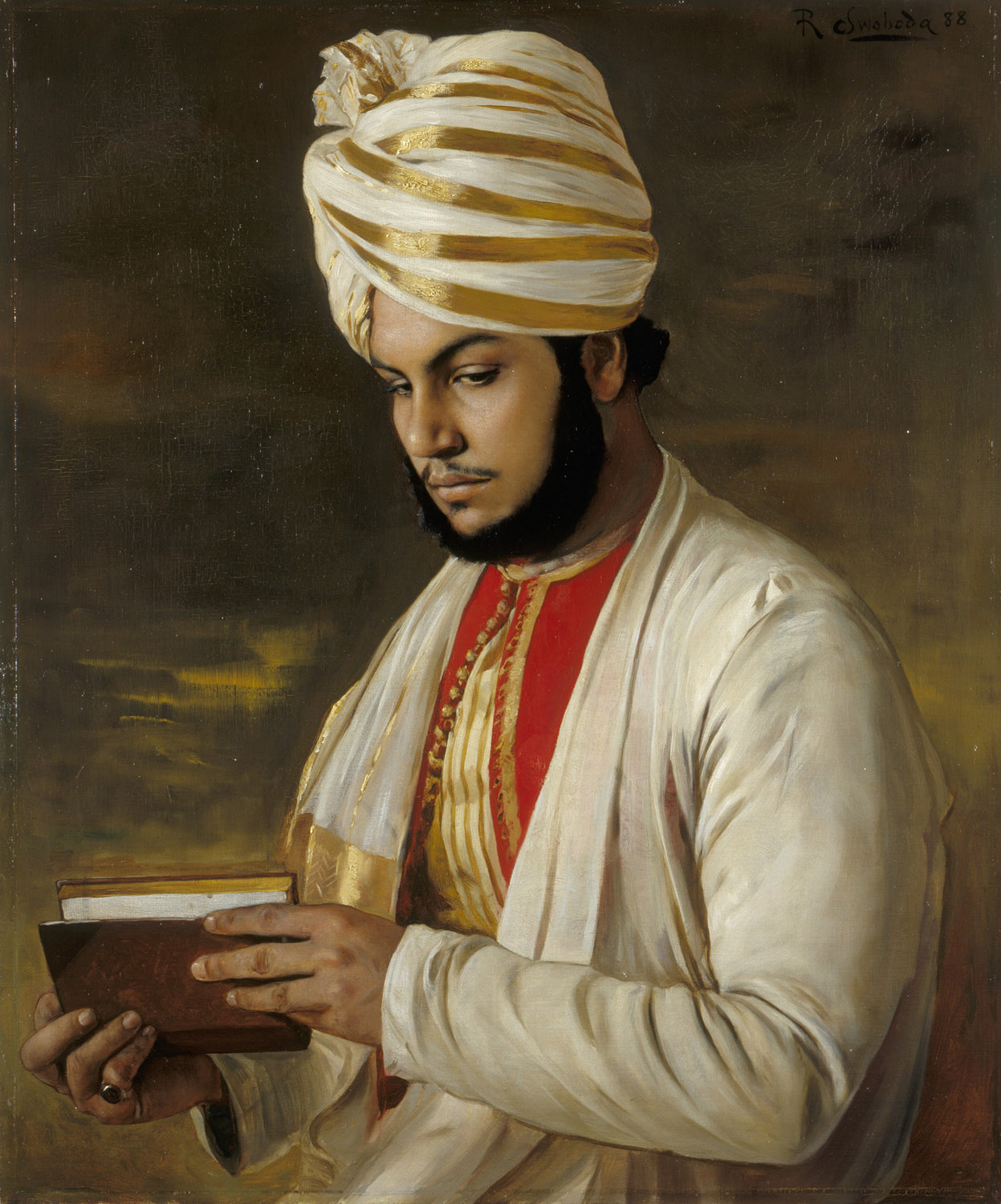
Adbdul Karim (the Munshi)

- Munshi Abdur Rouf (1943–1971), Bangladeshi freedom fighter
- Munshi Balaram Das, 17th century artistocrat and one of the early scions of Kadirpara zamindar family
- Munshibari family of Comilla, a British Raj era Zamindar family from Bengal Presidency
- Munshibari family of Ulipur, a British Raj era Zamindar family from Bengal Presidency
- Munshi family of Kadirpara and Chougachi, an extended British Raj era Zamindar family from Bengal Presidency
- Munshi Harakh Lal (early 19th century), founder of Sahay noble family
- Munshi Mohammad Fazle Kader (1928–2019), Indian citizen who was awarded Friends of Liberation War Honour
- Munshi Nawal Kishore (1836–1895), Indian book publisher
- Munshi Premchand (1880–1936), pioneer of Hindi and Urdu social fiction
- Munshi Raisuddin (1901–1973), Bangladeshi musician, Ekushey Padak awardee
- Munshi Raziuddin (1912–2003), Pakistani Qawwali singer
- Munshi Siddique Ahmad (1924–2011), Bangladeshi rice scientist
- Munshi Wadud, Bangladeshi lyricist
- Mohan Lal Kashmiri (1812–1877), Indian diplomat involved in the Great Game
- Priya Ranjan Dasmunsi (1945–2017), former Indian Union Minister
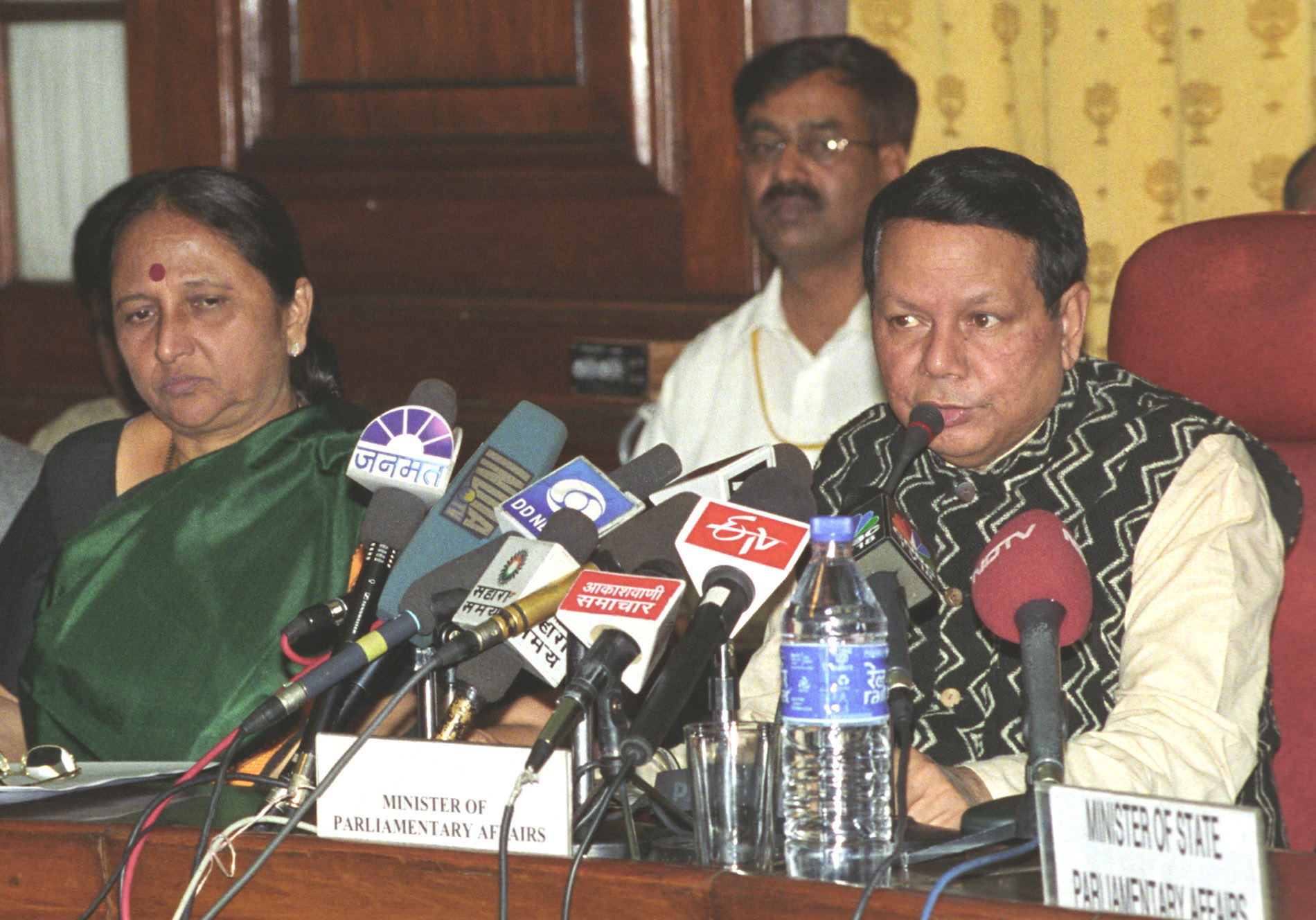
  The Union Minister for Information & Broadcasting and Parliamentary Affairs, Shri Priyaranjan Dasmunsi
- Ritabrata Munshi (born 1976), Indian mathematician
- S. C. Munshi, Indian cardiologist
- Shayan Munshi (born 1980), Indian actor
- Shahzad Munshi (born 1969), Pakistani politician
- Shweta Munshi (born 2008), Indian actress
- Tipu Munshi (born 1950), Bangladeshi politician
- Vidya Munshi (1919–2014), leader of Communist Party of India and arguably the first woman journalist of India
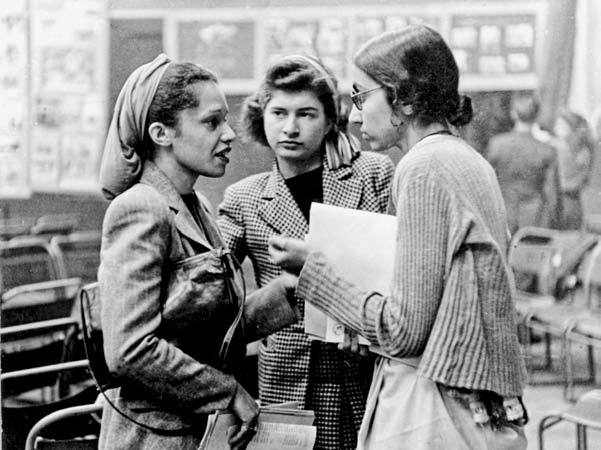
  Vidya Munshi, leader of Communist Party in India
- Zainon Munshi Sulaiman (1903–1989), Malaysian politician

== Other ==
- Munshigiri, Bangladeshi film
- Abdul Karim (the Munshi)
- Munshi Aziz Bhat Museum of Central Asian and Kargil Trade Artefacts, Public Museum in Kargil
- Munshi Pulia metro station, metro station
- Munshi Premchand Mahavidyalaya, college
- Munshiganj District, a district of Bangladesh
