= Cooke and Kelvey =

Cooke & Kelvey was founded in 1858 by Robert Thomas Cooke and Charles Kelvey. They were Kolkata-based clock-makers, silversmiths, jewelers working during the later period of British India. Notable Cooke and Kelvey clocks include those in the Salar Jung Museum in Hyderabad, the Bhim Chandra Nag sweet shop in Kolkata, and the Fairlie Warehouse in Kolkata. They remain silversmiths with showroom in New Delhi . Also they are the first and oldest appointed Rolex and Tudor retailers in India since 1946.

== History ==
Cooke & Kelvey, Pearl & Diamond Merchants, Jewellers, and Gold and Silver Art Workers held a leading position in the pre-independence British era. They were appointed jewellers to the Earl of Mayo and received this favour of appointment from every succeeding Governor-General and Viceroy in those days. They had beautifully appointed showrooms with rare jewels of immense value collected from all parts of the world. Their display of solid silver, testimonial plates, electroplate, clocks, watches etc were unrivalled. Among the exciting articles which have been designed and manufactured by this firm are jewelled crowns, swords, belts, silver bedsteads, howdahs, state chairs, challenge cups, shields, address caskets, all of which have been manufactured for some notable occasion, and special mention must be made of the caskets presented to his Majesty King Edward, when, as Prince of Wales, he visited Calcutta in 1875, and then as King-Emperor in December 1905.

Tower clocks were also a specialty of this firm, and examples of this work have been made and erected in various parts of India. Being contractors to (Her Majesty's) Government, they were large manufacturers of station and office clocks. Racing chronographs and complicated watches were also a leading feature of their business. The chronograph watches used by the Calcutta Turf Club for timing all important races have been supplied by this firm for many years.
