= Kadirpara Estate =

Kadirpara Zamindari কাদিরপাড়া জমিদারি
- Zamindari Estate
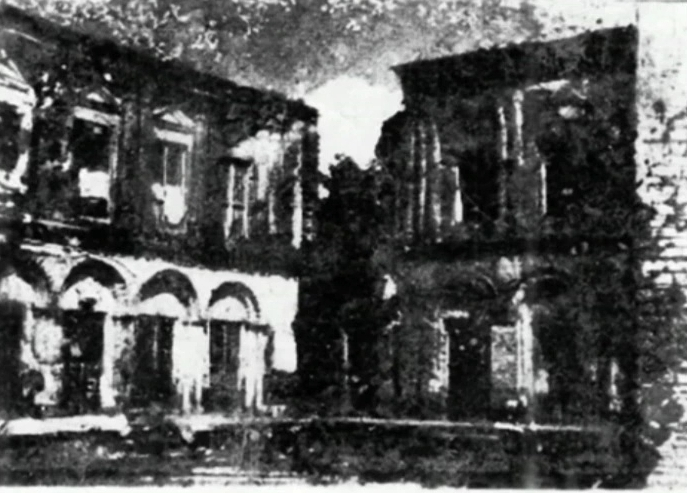
- An old photograph of Kadirpara Babu Zamindar Bari
- Founder: Munshi Balaram Das and Ramram Das
- Possession: 17th century
- Accession: 1950

Kadirpara Estate was a zamindari in erstwhile Kadirpara during British Raj era. It was founded by Munshi Balaram Das, who served as the Munshi of Raja Sitaram Ray, the 17th century independent Hindu monarch who revolted against the Mughal Empire. Initially during Mughal period, and later during British period, this zamindari became one of the prominent zamindaries in eastern part of Bengal. The ruins of the zamindari palace, popularly known as Kadirpara Babu Zamindar Bari still exists. It is a place of interest in Magura District of present-day Bangladesh.

== History ==
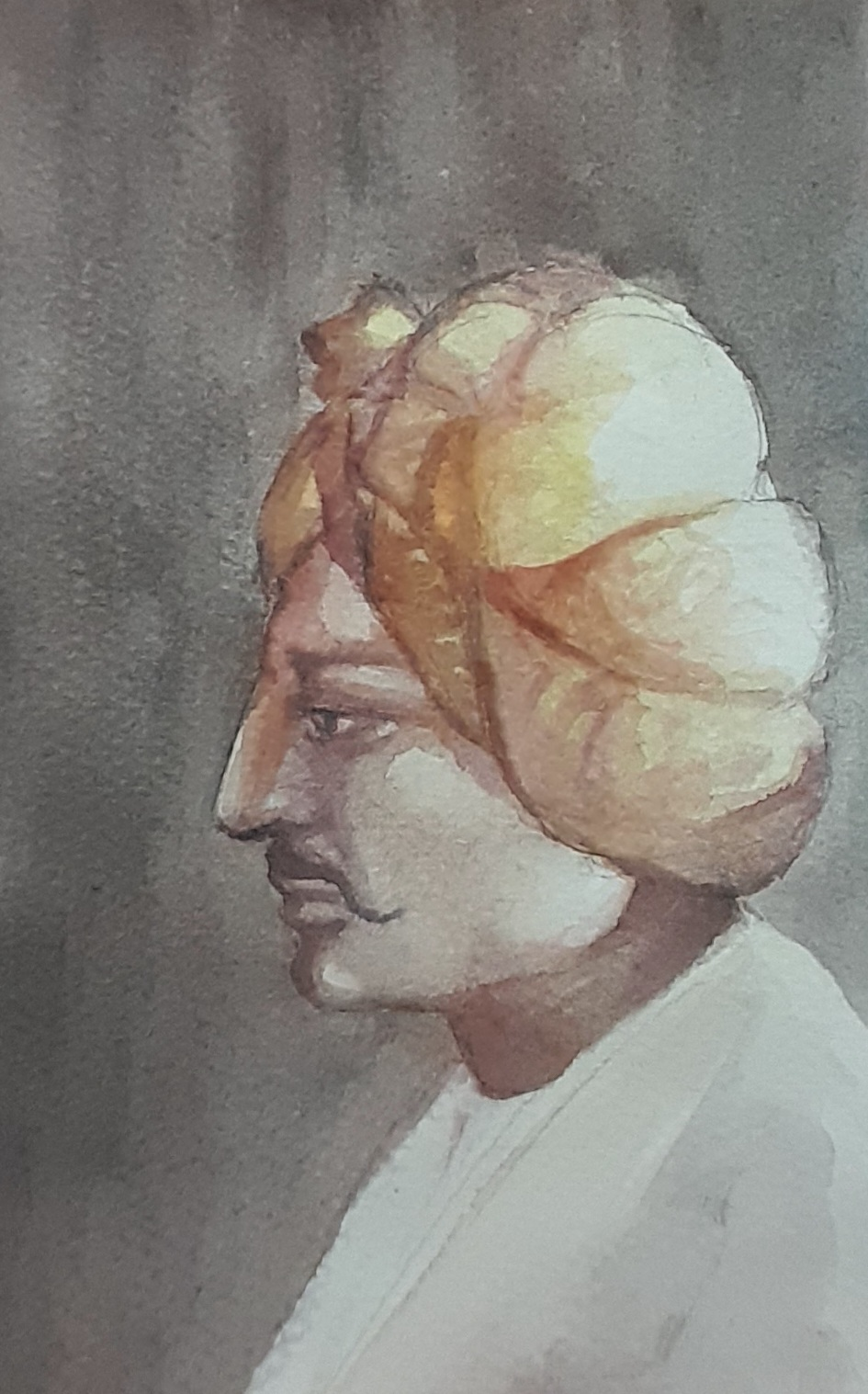
Portrait attributed to Munshi Balaram Das, the founder and first Zamindar of the Kadirpara Estate

Munshi Balaram was a close associate of Raja Sitaram Ray. According to noted writer Satishchandra Mitra, he was a descendant of Mahatma Narasimha Das, a contemporary personality of Ballal Sena of Sena Dynasty. As a result of a conflict with Ballal Sena, Tilak Karkat and Jatadhar Nag belonging to Barendra Kayastha clan established their state in Shailkupa, along with Das family, Nandy family and Chaki family under their refuge.

Mahatma Narasimha Das is regarded as the progenitor of the Das family (later Munshi family), whose descendants finally settled at Shailkupa, as a result of warfare and hostilities. Their efficient political diplomacy established them as aristocrats within Bengal, and they were conferred with the title Majumdar by Nawab of Bengal. But, due to continuous joint attacks of Arakanese and Portuguese pirates forced Majumdar Rajivlochan Das, father of Munshi Balaram, to move from Shailkupa to initially Dariapur, followed by Kadirpara, along with family. Rajivlochan had three sons named Hariram, Ramram and Balaram, respectively. It is said that Ramram and Balaram once fought off the attack of the fearsome robbers with immense courage which grabbed the attention of Raja Sitaram Ray. The Raja granted the siblings a whole village called 'Bil Pakuria', and appointed Balaram as Munshi in his court. Following this, Munshi Balaram was established in power helping himself to raise huge wealth in Kadirpara, which resulted in the foundation of Kadirpara Estate. The Munshis were involved in philanthropy, educational upbringing and religious reformation in Dariapur and Kadirpara. The Dariapur Shri Shri Siddheshwari Kalimata Temple was founded by the Munshis of Kadirpara. The last zamindar of the estate, Babu Gopendranath Munshi was a physician and licensed medical practitioner who used to provide treatment free of charge to financially challenged commoners.

== Zamindars ==
- Munshi Balaram Das (childless, succeeded by Ramram's son Radhakrishna), Ramram Das and Hariram Das
- Babu Radhakrishna Munshi
- Babu Raghunath Munshi
- Babu Gobindanath Munshi
- Babu Chandranath Munshi
- Babu Jatindranath Munshi
- Babu Gopendranath Munshi

== Debuttar Estate ==
The zamindars of Kadirpara endowed 10 acres land of their property in favour of their family deity Radhakanta Lakshmi Narayan Jiu. According to a report published in Dhaka Tribune in 2017, there was an incident of vandalizing the Radhakanta Lakshmi Narayan Jiu and Shitala temples at Sreepur Upazila, within the Debuttar Estate. The zamindars also founded the 150 years old Sri Sri Siddheswari Kali temple in Dariapur. In 2022, there was an incident of theft in the Siddheswari Kali temple.
