= Dariapur Union, Sreepur =

Dariapur Union দ্বারিয়াপুর ইউনিয়ন
- Union
- Amalsar Union
- Location within Bangladesh
- Country: Bangladesh
- Division: Khulna
- District: Magura
- Upazila: Sreepur

Area
  - Total: 14.25 km^{2} (5.50 sq mi)

Population (2011)
  - Total: 19,467
  - Density: 1,366/km^{2} (3,538/sq mi)
- Time zone: UTC+6 (BST)
- Website: dariapurup.magura.gov.bd

Dariapur Union (Bengali: দ্বারিয়াপুর ইউনিয়ন) is a union parishad situated at Sreepur Upazila, in Magura District, Khulna Division of Bangladesh. The union has an area of 14.25 square kilometres (5.50 sq mi) and as of 2001 had a population of 19,467. There are 19 villages and 11 mouzas in the union.
