= Mantri =

Sanskrit word

Mantri is a word of Sanskrit origin (meaning sage, i.e. the "person who thinks and says" in that language, cf. Mantra), and it is used for a variety of public offices, from fairly humble to ministerial in rank. The term was used in various Asian cultures and eventually was used by early European traders. The term also forms part of a number of compounds. It is the root of the English word mandarin, for a bureaucrat of the Chinese empire (though the word was never used by the Chinese themselves).

== South Asia ==
=== Bangladesh ===
- Montri is used synonymously with Minister in Bengali language.
- Prodhanmontri: Prime Minister
- Montri: Minister
- Protimontri: Minister of state
- Upomontri: Deputy minister
- Montri-Shobha: Cabinet
- Montri-Porishod: Council of Ministers

=== India ===
- The word Mantri is often used to mean 'Minister' in Hindi as well as in many other Indian languages, several variations such as Mukhyamantri (chief minister) and Pradhanmantri (prime minister) are also used.
- In Satara, where the Peshwa (formally First Minister) took over political power from the nominal Monarch: Mantri was used as synonymous Sanskrit version of Waqnis (Fourth Minister)
- In Coastal Maharashtra Mantri surname is used by Somvanshi Kshatriya Pathare Community residing in coastal region of Maharashtra.
- Mantri is a surname used by Maheshwari caste, part of Marwadi community.
- Mantri is a surname used by Yadav People in North Districts of Tamil Nadu.
- Mantri is a surname used by Niyogi Brahmins in Andhra Pradesh.
- Mantri is also the brand name of a real estate company based in Bangalore, founded by Sushil Mantri.
- Mantri is a surname used by Bardeskar Gaud Saraswat Brahmin community in Goa. Mantri are Mhajan of Shree Shantadurga Temple Kavlem and Vetal Maharudra Sansthan Shirodwadi Mulgao Goa.
- Mantri is also a surname used by Deshastha Brahmins in Maharashtra.

=== Nepal ===
- Mantri: Minister of State
- Pradhan Mantri: Prime Minister (compare Pradhan)

== South East Asia ==
=== Brunei ===
Mentri (or Mantri): ministerial rank below vizier.

=== Cambodia ===
- /nieyʊək roat~roattʰaʔ mʊəntrəy/ (នាយករដ្ឋមន្ត្រី; nāyaka raṭṭha mantrī): Prime Minister
- /ʔuʔpaʔnieyɔǝk roat~roattʰaʔ mʊəntrəy/ (ឧបនាយករដ្ឋមន្ត្រី; upanāyaka raṭṭha mantrī): Deputy Prime Minister
- /roattʰaʔmʊəntrəy/ (រដ្ឋមន្ត្រី; raṭṭha mantrī): Minister
- /keaʔnaʔroattʰaʔmʊəntrəy/(គណៈរដ្ឋមន្ត្រី; gaṇa raṭṭha mantrī): Council of Ministers
- /mʊəntrəy/ (មន្ត្រី, mantrī): official, minister, counsellor

=== Indonesia ===
- Mantri, in the form of Menteri is a Sanskrit loanword that describes ministers of the government. Perdana Menteri (corresponding exactly to Pradhan Mantri) is used to describe prime ministers (as Indonesia is a presidential country, it is mainly used to describe prime ministers of other countries adopting the parliamentary system).
- in Buleleng Mantri occurred (rank unclear)
- in Deli the title of Tengku Perdana Mantri was created 1 February 1923 for Tengku Harun al-Rashid ibni al-Marhum Sultan Ma'amun al-Rashid Perkasa 'Alam Shah, eldest brother of the Crown Prince (Sultan the next year) and Wakil of Bedagai 1932
- in Kutai, Perdana-mantri was the first great Officer of state, or Chief Minister
- in Sambas, Radin Mantri was a high title for princes of the blood, e.g. borne by Sri Paduka al-Sultan Tuanku 'Abu Bakar Taj ud-din I [al-Marhum Janggut] ibni al-Marhum Sultan 'Umar Akam ud-din, future Sultan of Sambas, before his accession on the death of his father, 1790
- in Yogyakarta and Surakarta palaces—the term is part of administrative titles for positions within the palaces and places that they control.

=== Malaysia ===
Other than Menteri:

- Perdana Menteri: Prime Minister
- Timbalan Perdana Menteri: Deputy Prime Minister
- Jemaah Menteri: Cabinet (lit. 'the Ministerial Congregation')
- as part of chief titles of leaders in various constitutive sultanates, also in compounds

=== Thailand ===
- Nayok Rattha Montri (นายกรัฐมนตรี): Prime Minister
- Rawng Nayok Rattha Montri (รองนายกรัฐมนตรี): Deputy Prime Minister
- Rattha Montri Waa Kan (รัฐมนตรีว่าการ): Minister
- Khana Rattha Montri (คณะรัฐมนตรี): Cabinet
