= Majumdar =

- Pronunciation: Mojumdar

Origin
- Origin: Bengali (from Arabic and Persian)
- Meaning: Record Keeper, Archivist, Treasurer, Accountant
- Region of origin: Bengal

Other names
- Variant form: numerous

Majumdar (Bengali: মজুমদার) is a surname commonly found among Bengalis, including both Hindus and Muslims, in West Bengal, Assam, and Bangladesh. The surname derives from a Persian administrative title meaning "record keeper" or "keeper of accounts" and is also found among Marathi, Gujarati, and other communities in India, in forms such as Mujumdar and Muzumdar.

== Etymology and history ==
The name literally translates to 'record keeper' or 'archivist', from the Arabic language majmua (مجموع/মজমুয়া) 'collection' + the Persian suffix -dar (دار/দার) 'possessor'. The surname has evolved from this title.

The surname is found among both Hindu and Muslim Bengalis and should not be confused with the similar "Mujumdar" or "Muzumdar", found among Marathis, and to some extent among the peoples of Gujarat, Madhya Pradesh, and Uttar Pradesh. The Bengali Mirashdars (Note: Mirashdar is a term referring to a landowner who pays taxes directly to the government.) living in the former Kachari Kingdom were given titles by the Kachari Raja, which in modern-day acts as a surname for them.

== Variations ==
Variations of the surname Majumdar also remain very common. These include different English transliterations and regional pronunciations of the term. Different English spellings include: Mojumdar, Majumder, Mojumder, Mazumdar, Mozumdar, Mazumder, Mozumder, Majoomdar, Mojoomdar, Majoomder, Mojoomder, Mazoomdar, Mozoomdar, Mazoomder, Mozoomder and Muzumdar.

== List of people with the surname ==
=== Majumdar ===
- Aarti Majumdar American actress of Indian descent, better known as Aarti Mann
- Anita Majumdar, Canadian actress
- Amiya Bhūşhan Majumdār (1918–2001), novelist
- Apala Majumdar, British mathematician
- Apratim Majumdar, classical musician
- Arun Majumdar, first Director of the Advanced Research Projects Agency - Energy, U.S. Department of Energy
- Badiul Alam Majumdar, Bangladeshi economist, development worker, political analyst
- Barbara Majumdar (1947–2025), English long-distance runner
- Bibhal Majumdar, cricketer
- Binoy Majumdar (1934–2006), Bengali poet
- Boria Majumdar, journalist, author, and cricket historian
- Chanchal Kumar Majumdar (1938–2000), physicist, founder of S. N. Bose National Centre for Basic Sciences
- Charu Majumdar (1918–1972), Maoist revolutionary and founder of the Communist Party of India (Marxist–Leninist)
- Chittabrata Majumdar (1935–2007), General Secretary of Centre of Indian Trade Unions
- Dakshinaranjan Mitra Majumdar, fairy tale writer
- Hemen Majumdar, Indian painter
- Janab Ali Majumdar, Bengali politician
- Kamal Kumar Majumdar (1914–1979), writer
- Karun Krishna Majumdar, only IAF pilot to be decorated with a Bar on his DFC
- Leela Majumdar (1908–2007), author
- Mahmudur Rahman Majumdar (1922–2011), commanding officer of East Pakistan Regiment Centre
- Manu Majumdar (1959–2024), Bangladeshi Member of Parliament for Netrokona-1
- Mohitlal Majumdar (1888–1952), author
- Obaidullah Majumdar (born 1927), East Pakistan minister
- Phani Majumdar, Indian director
- Pinaki Majumdar, condensed matter physicist
- R. C. Majumdar (1888–1980), compiler and partial author of The History and Culture of the Indian Peoples, a definitive work on Indian history, and other works
- Ramendu Majumdar, Bangladeshi actor
- Ramesh Chandra Majumdar (1904–1995), physicist who made contributions in statistical mechanics and ionospheric physics
- Rakhee Majumdar, Indian actress
- Ronu Majumdar, flautist
- Samaresh Majumdar (1944–2023), author. Magsaysay awardee. Sahitya Akademi, 1984
- Saikat Majumdar, novelist.
- Shuvaloy Majumdar, Canadian Member of Parliament
- Simon Majumdar, British-American chef, author, and television personality
- Air Commodore S. K. Majumdar (1927–2011), India's first military helicopter pilot
- Sreela Majumdar (1958–2024), actress
- Sudhansu Datta Majumdar, physicist
- Sudhir Ranjan Majumdar (1939–2009), former Chief Minister of Tripura
- Tarun Majumdar (1931–2022), director. National Film Award, 1979
- Tejendra Majumdar, sarod player

=== Mazumdar ===
- Abdul Matlib Mazumdar (1890–1980), Indian freedom fighter and political leader
- Abraham Mazumdar, Indian conductor and violinist
- Ambica Charan Mazumdar (1850–1922), Indian politician, President of the Indian National Congress
- Anita Mazumdar Desai, novelist. Sahitya Akademi, 1978. Shortlisted three times for the Booker Prize
- Asit Mazumdar, Indian politician
- Anupam Mazumdar, British-Indian Theoretical Physicist
- Birendra Nath Mazumdar, (died 1987), doctor and only Indian prisoner in Colditz
- Chandana Mazumdar, Bangladeshi singer
- Chittrovanu Mazumdar (born 1956), Kolkata-based artist
- Lakshmi Mazumdar, National Commissioner of the Indian Scouting organization from 1964 to 1983
- Leela Majumdar (1908–2007), Bengali writer
- Maxim Mazumdar (1952–1988), Indo-Canadian playwright and director
- Nalin Mazumdar, ustaad of the Hawaiian Guitar, also known as the Slide Guitar
- Nirode Mazumdar, Indian painter from the first generation of Indian modernists
- Pandit Ronu Mazumdar (born 1963), Indian flautist in the Hindustani Classical Music tradition
- Pratap Chandra Mazumdar (1840–1905), leader of the Hindu reform movement, the Brahmo Samaj, in Bengal
- Sandhya Mazumdar, former Test and One Day International cricketer who represented India
- Shipra Mazumdar, member of the first women's expedition to successfully climb Mt. Everest
- Sravanti Mazumdar, Indian Bengali singer, songwriter, radio host and broadcaster.
- Tarun Mazumdar (1931–2022), Indian Bengali film director
- Tulip Mazumdar (born 1981) British journalist and broadcaster for the BBC
- Vina Mazumdar (1927–2013), Indian academic, feminist, a pioneer in Women studies in India

=== Majumder ===
- Kamal Ahmed Majumder, Bangladeshi politician
- Khaleda Zia née Majumder, Prime Minister of Bangladesh (1991–1996 and 2001–2006), Chair of the Bangladesh Nationalist Party
- Maia Majumder, American computational epidemiologist
- Renuka Majumder, Indian cricketer
- Sadhan Chandra Majumder, Bangladeshi politician
- Shaun Majumder, Canadian comedian and actor
- Silajit Majumder, songwriter and actor
- Debjit Majumder, footballer

=== Mazumder ===
- Bappa Mazumder, Bangladeshi lyricist
- Barun Mazumder, Indian journalist
- Ferdousi Mazumder, Bangladeshi actress
- Gauriprasanna Mazumder (1924–1986), Bengali lyricist, best known for Coffee Houser Shei Addata
- Hafiz Ahmed Mazumder, Chairman of Bangladesh Red Crescent Society

=== Other spellings ===
- Abdul Baten Mojumdar Komol (born 1987), Bangladeshi footballer and coach
- Akhoy Kumar Mozumdar, first Indian to earn American citizenship
- Amol Muzumdar (born 1974), Indian cricketer
- Protap Chunder Mozoomdar, Brahmo delegate to the World Parliament of Religions, researcher on Christianity

== See also ==
- Bura Mazumdar, village in Barguna District in the Barisal Division of southern-central Bangladesh
- Majumdar–Ghosh model, one-dimensional quantum Heisenberg spin model
- Majumdar-Papapetrou solution
- Mazumdar Shaw Medical Centre in Bangalore, India
- Mouzadar
- Mazumder
