= Chougachi Estate =

Chougachi Zamindari চৌগাছি জমিদারি
- Zamindari Estate
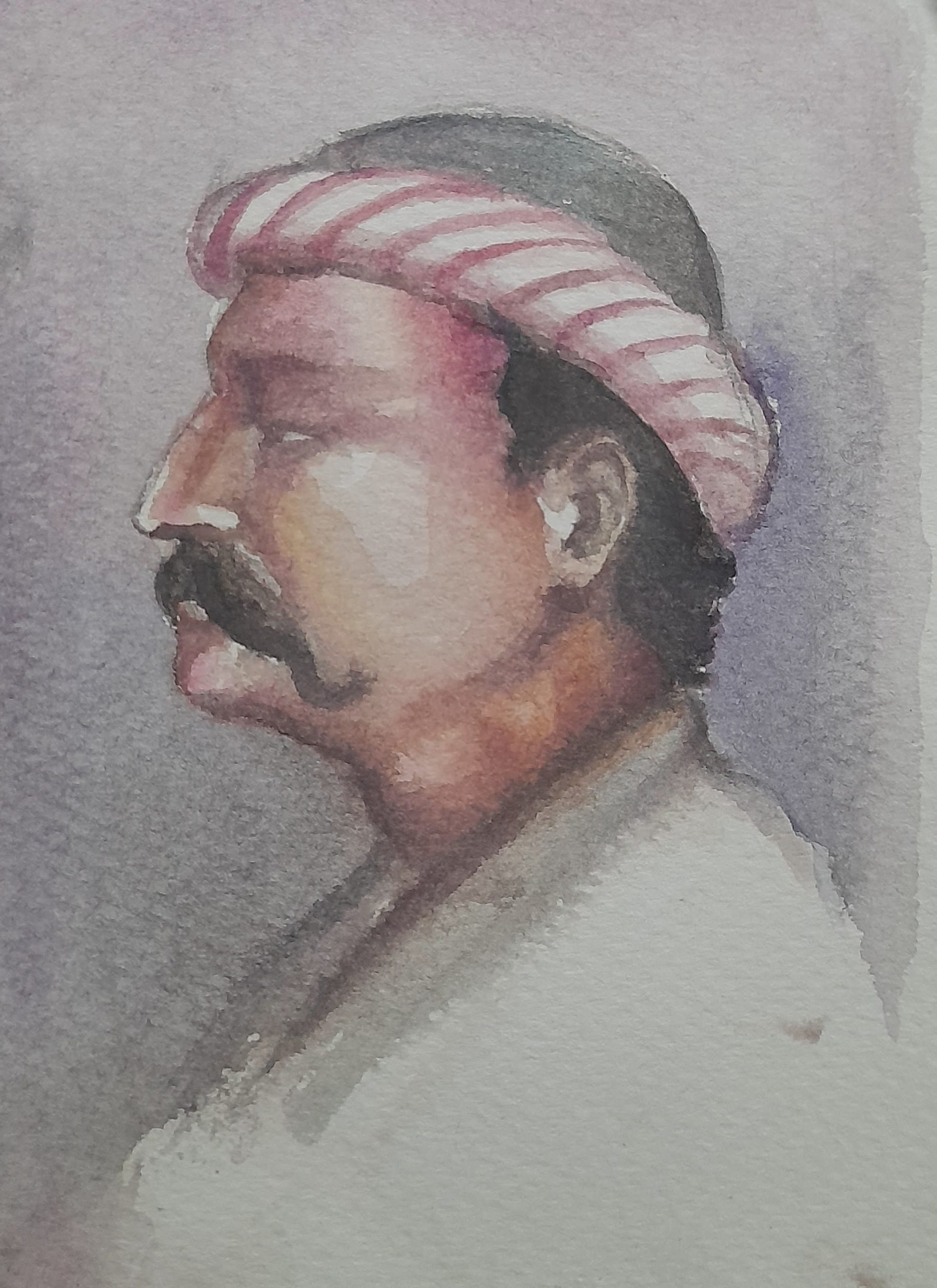
- Portrait attributed to Babu Banwari Charan Munshi, zamindar of Chougachi
- Country: British Raj (present-day Bangladesh)
- Founder: Babu Achyut Charan Munshi
- Number of Villages: 63-84 villages
- Possession: 19th century
- Accession: 1950

Chougachi Estate was a zamindari estate in the Chougachi village under Sreepur, Magura of erstwhile Jessore during British Raj. It came into existence as an offshoot of Kadirpara Estate during Babu Achyut Charan Munshi, a scion of Kadirpara zamindar family.

== History ==
Although the zamindari roughly came into action in 1865, it became influential during 1905-1906. According to an essay published in Bdnews24.com, which was written by noted author and journalist Mir Waliuzzaman, a scion of Kadirpara Estate named Babu Achyut Charan Munshi became the de facto landlord of Chougachi following the departure of Mr. Hodgson, the owner of indigo factory in Chougachi, from India. Achyut Charan was serving as the Munshi of Mr. Hodgson. Amidst ongoing protests against Partition of Bengal in 1905, Hodgson left India bestowing the responsibility of Kuthi Chougachi (indigo plant in Chougachi) to Achyut Charan. Achyut Charan, with sharp foresight, rose into overwhelming wealth. The zamindari remained influential and powerful in erstwhile eastern part of Bengal for nearly 40–45 years during Babu Banwari Charan Munshi and Babu Amulya Charan Munshi, following Achyut Charan, until the abolition of zamindars by the East Bengal State Acquisition and Tenancy Act of 1950. This zamindari consisted of 21 mouzas, each with 3-4 villages. During Banwari Charan Munshi's tenure as the zamindar, Jasimuddin served as the manager of estate. Later, Qazi Ansaruddin Ahmad served as the estate manager during Amulya Charan Munshi's tenure.

== Zamindars ==
- Babu Achyut Charan Munshi
- Babu Banwari Charan Munshi
- Babu Amulya Charan Munshi

== Notable people ==
- Anukul Charan Munshi, noted Indian artist known for introducing Indian Mother-of-Pearl art
- Annada Munsi, Father of commercial art in India
- Harendranath Munshi, Indian revolutionary who courted martyrdom as a result of brutal Force-feeding following a fatal hunger strike while protesting against inhuman treatments with the political prisoners and their classification as criminals
- Manu Munsi, renowned Indian Mother-of-Pearl artist
