= Kadirpara Union =

Kadirpara Union কাদিরপাড়া ইউনিয়ন
- Union
- Kadirpara Union
- Location within Bangladesh
- Country: Bangladesh
- Division: Khulna
- District: Magura
- Upazila: Sreepur

Area
  - Total: 15.24 km^{2} (5.88 sq mi)

Population (2011)
  - Total: 15,233
  - Density: 999.5/km^{2} (2,589/sq mi)
- Time zone: UTC+6 (BST)
- Website: kadirparaup.magura.gov.bd

Kadirpara Union (Bengali: কাদিরপাড়া ইউনিয়ন) is a union parishad situated at Sreepur Upazila, in Magura District, Khulna Division of Bangladesh. The union has an area of 15.24 square kilometres (5.88 sq mi) and as of 2001 had a population of 25,679. There are 13 villages and 11 mouzas in the union.
