= Raja Sitaram Ray =

Sitaram Ray
- Raja

Position abolished
- Born: c. 1658; Mahapatipur, Katwa, Burdwan, Bengal Subah, Mughal Empire
- Died: October, 1714 (aged 56); Murshidabad, Bengal Subah, Mughal Empire
- Wives: Sree; Kamala
- Issue: Shyamsundar, Surnarayan, Bamdev, Jaydev
- Father: Udaynarayan Das
- Mother: Dayamayi Ghosh
- Religion: Hinduism (Vaishnavism)
- Occupation: Zamindar

Raja Sitaram Ray (Bengali: রাজা সীতারাম রায়; 1658–1714) was initially a zamindar under the Mughal Empire, who revolted and declared independence against the empire and established a short-lived sovereign Hindu dominion in Bengal region of the Indian subcontinent.

== Early life ==
=== Childhood ===
Sitaram was born in Rarh Bengal in a Das family, who originally came from Gaud Banga (later known as Murshidabad). His father was Udaynarayan, a landlord and Tehsildar under the Faujdar of Bhusna and mother, Dayamayi. When Mir Jumla transferred the capital back to Dhaka in 1660, Udaynarayan also moved to Dhaka. At that time, he did not bring his family with him. It is said that when Udaynarayan was away a pathan dacoit had attacked his house. Dayamayi fought with the pathan with her sword, killing him and her extreme dexterity with the sword won the admiration of all. Shaista Khan became the governor of Bengal in 1664. At that time, Udaynarayan rose to the post of tehsildar and shifted to Bhusna. After a few years, he built a residence at Hariharanagar near the banks of Madhumati and brought his family there.

Sitaram spent his childhood at his maternal uncle's home at Katwa. At school, he learned Sanskrit and, though Bengali was not taught at the chatuspathis, he studied it at home. He could recite Chandidas and Jaydev, and had very good handwriting. As he began to grow up, he had to learn Persian, the official language of the Mughal Empire. Later, when he arrived at Bhusna, he picked up Urdu, during interactions with the Muslims. In his childhood, he also learned how to wield a lathi, and learned horse riding and fencing after arriving at Hariharanagar.

=== Early adulthood ===
While he was growing up, Sitaram used to frequently visit Dhaka, the provincial capital of Bengal. Shaista Khan was very impressed with his courage and work. At that time, a Pathan rebel named Karim Khan was wreaking havoc in the pargana of Satair. The Mughal faujdar had failed to suppress him and Shaista Khan wondered how to crush the rebellion. When Sitaram came forward to subdue the rebel, the governor sent him on the mission with a few thousand infantry and cavalry. Sitaram fought valiantly and Karim Khan was killed. Shaista Khan, very impressed with the success, rewarded Sitaram with the jagir of Naldi pargana.

== Career ==
=== Reign as Jagirdar ===
After obtaining the jaigir, Sitaram concentrated on building an army. At Dhaka, he became acquainted with a soldier of fortune named Ramrup Ghosh, who accompanied him on the mission against Karim Khan. Ramrup was not only a great soldier, but also an accomplished strongman, well versed in wrestling. He was popularly known as Mena Hati, for he had killed a small elephant with his bare hands. Ramrup became the chief of Sitaram's army. Two other generals were Rupchand Dhali and Fakira Machhkata. Bakhtar Khan, a Pathan dacoit, and Amal Baig, a Mughal soldier, also joined his ranks.

After the death of Shah Jahan, the Mughal battle for succession left the province in turmoil. Lawlessness was rampant. Naldi was infested with dacoits and Sitaram had overcome them in order to restore order to the troubled pargana. Soon, the dacoity was suppressed and Sitaram became the saviour of the masses, after which he began to be compared to the village deity Nishanath.

Sitaram built his residence in the village of Suryakunda, where the erstwhile revenue office was also located. Garrisons were set up both at Suryakunda and Hariharanagar. His father was still stationed at Bhusna and he visited him regularly. At this time, he added some talukas of Satair to his jagir.

Around 1684, Sitaram's parents died in quick succession. After the sraddha, he went on a pilgrimage to Gaya. His secretary, Muniram Ray, and principal aide, Ramrup Ghosh, accompanied him. The affairs of the jagir were entrusted to his younger brother Lakshmi Narayan. After completing the ceremonial rites at Gaya, he travelled to the Mughal court at Delhi and made a plea for vassal rule under the empire. In 1688, he was granted the title of Raja and additionally granted the right of Southern Bengal extending into the Sunderbans.

=== Reign as monarch ===
In the same year, Sitaram was ceremonially sworn in as the king of Naldi, Satair and the Bhati region of lower Bengal. Although he had become a king, he had no capital. Therefore, he constructed a fortified capital at Mohammadpur, near Suryakunda.

Mohammadpur was guarded on three sides by bils and on the east by Madhumati. The fort was square, with each side not less than 1,300 feet (400 m), built of earthen bricks and surrounded by a moat. Beyond the fort were natural and artificial water bodies for protection. To the north and east was the Kaliganga River. To the west were the beels and Chhatravati river. To the east was Madhumati. In the south, Sitaram constructed a moat extending from east to west, measuring almost a mile in length and 200 feet (61 m) in width.

Inside the fort, Sitaram set up garrisons and built residences, temples and tanks. He encouraged craftsmen and merchants to set up businesses at Mohammadpur, and soon it became a thriving metropolis abuzz with trade and commerce. Sitaram added new recruits to the army and added an artillery division. His two famous cannons, Kale Khan and Jhumjhum Khan, were commissioned during this time.

After the demise of Satrajit Ray, the son of Mukundaram Ray and one of the Bara Bhuiyans of Bengal in 1636, the royal family diminished in stature. Kalinarayan Ray, the son of Satrajit, was a zamindar of the small parganas of Rupapat, Poktani, Rukanpur & Kachuberia taraf of Naldi pargana under the chakla of Bhusna. During Sitaram's reign, the minor sons of Kalinarayan's grandson Krishna Prasad were the zamindars. Sitaram annexed this small feudatory into his kingdom.

To the west of Satrajitpur lay the pargana of Mahmudshahi, at the time under the zamindari of Naldanga. When Sitaram invaded Mahamudshahi, Ramdev, the zamindar of Naldanga, was forced to cede the pargana to Sitaram. Later, when Sachipati Majumdar, the zamindar of Nanduali revolted against Ramdev and stopped paying taxes, Sitaram supported him and made a treaty with him.

Sitaram annexed the small zamindars in the north up to the Padma, and even some portions to the north of Padma in the district of Pabna. Most of these zamindars were under Pathan rule. To the north of Satair lay the jagir of a Pathan named Daulat Khan. After his demise, the estate broke into four parganas – Nasibshahi, Nusratshahi, Mahimshahi & Belgachhi.

Sitaram invaded Nasibshahi when the battle for succession was taking place among the sons of Daulat Khan. Sitaram defeated Nasibshahi in the battle of Malanchigram and the battle of Kalikapur. After defeating the other sons of Daulat Khan, Sitaram annexed all four parganas into his kingdom. The conquest of these Pathan feudatories took place between 1702 and 1704.

When Sitaram was away from Mohammadpur, Manohar Ray, the zamindar of Chanchra, conspired with the Nurullah Khan, the Mughal faujdar of Mirzanagar, to attack Mohammadpur. At that time, the capital was entrusted with his Brahmin diwan Jadunath Majumdar. The combined forces of Manohar Ray and Nurullah Khan camped at Bunagati.

Jadunath connected the streams of Chitra and Phatki by a canal to check their further advancement and garrisoned his troops and artillery. Manohar Ray, sensing defeat, made peace with Jadunath and retreated. When Sitaram received the news, he immediately invaded the Ishafpur pargana of Chanchra and advanced with his troops to Nilganj. Manohar was forced to accept the suzerainty of Sitaram and pay revenue to him.

In the Sundarbans, Sitaram's domain lay to the east of Shibsha river, corresponding to the modern district of Bagerhat. In 1710, when the peasants revolted and stopped paying taxes, he advanced with his troops in vessels like sip and palwar along the Madhumati towards the south. In the battle of Rampal, he defeated the rebels and annexed the parganas of Churulia and Madhudiya.

Sitaram's kingdom extended from the northern banks of Padma to the Bay of Bengal in the south. The kingdom constituted of two distinct regions – the densely populated urban settlements to the north of the Bhairab River and the sparsely populated agricultural estates to the south of the Bhairab. The northern portion extended from Pabna in the north to Bhairab in the south and from Mahmudshahi pargana in the west to Telihati pargana in the east. The southern portion extended from Bhairab in the north to Bay of Bengal in the south, and from river Pashar in the west to Barisal in the east. The kingdom consisted of 44 parganas and its annual revenue amount to more than ten million.

== Conflict with the Mughals ==
When Azim-us-Shan became the subahdar of Bengal, he made his close relative Mir Abu Torap the faujdar of Bhusna. Although his primary duty was to keep Sitaram under check, he unleashed a reign of terror upon arriving at Bhusna. He forced the tax defaulters to convert to Islam. When Sitaram learned of such punitive measures, he resolved not to pay a penny to the Mughal treasury. Abu Torap sent a contemptful reminder explaining to him the consequences.

Abu Torap, however, did not have a warm relation with Murshid Quli Khan, the Diwan of Bengal, and Sitaram knew that well. Azim-us-Shan, the subahdar was away in Delhi. His son Farrukhsiyar the acting governor was more interested in the developments at Delhi than the affairs of Bengal. The capital of the province was relocated from Dhaka to Patna, so it was difficult for Abu Torap to get any direct support either from the Diwan or the Subahdar. Therefore, he decided to act on his own.

Abu Torap was only a faujdar and, therefore, he had limited resources at his disposal. Whenever he sent his forces to subdue Sitaram, they were confronted with the archers and soldiers who manned the borders of Sitaram's kingdom. In 1713, Murshid Quli Khan became the subahdar of Bengal and Abu Torap approached him for help, which he ignored. Abu Torap sent his troops once again, but Sitaram opted for guerrilla tactics and frustrated the Mughal army in the unfriendly terrain. Unwilling to give up, Abu Torap deputed his commander-in-chief Pir Khan, a Pathan to subdue Sitaram. The latter had set up his artillery along the banks of Madhumati and garrisoned his troops in the jungles in the tract between Madhumati and Barasia.

Sitaram's troops met the Mughal army in the banks of Barasia. During the battle, the Mughal army was defeated, and Mir Abu Torap was killed by Mena Hati. Sitaram's army marched forward and captured the fort of Bhusna. Sitaram stationed a section of his army at Bhusna and put himself at the command of the fort. The Mohammadpur fort was put under the command of Mena Hati. The rest of the army was garrisoned along the Madhumati. Sitaram knew that the clash with the Mughals was inevitable. Sitaram, therefore, began to strengthen his army and reinforce his artillery.

As the news of Abu Torap's death reached Murshidabad, Murshid Quli Khan immediately appointed his own brother-in-law Bux Ali Khan as the new faujdar of Bhusna. He notified all the zamindars to assist the faujdar in subduing Sitaram. Bux Ali Khan was accompanied to Bhusna by Sangram Singh the commander-in-chief of the provincial army of Bengal. Dayaram Ray, the principal aide of Raghunandan, the founder of the Natore estate, followed them with the zamindar's army under his command. Bux Ali Khan and Sangram Singh went along the Padma and embarked near Faridpur and then marched to Bhusna. Sitaram too marched forward with his troops and in the ensuing battle the Mughals were defeated. The Mughal army surrounded the fort of Bhusna and Sitaram sensed that it would be difficult to hold on to both the forts at Bhusna and Mohammadpur.

In the meantime, Dayaram had marched to Mohammadpur with his forces. Knowing that it would not be easy for him to capture the fort in a direct battle, he conspired and had Mena Hati killed by sabotage, sending his severed head to Murshidabad. On receiving the news of Mena Hati's death, Sitaram retreated to Mohammadpur with most of his troops. Bux Ali Khan, too, followed him to Mohammadpur. Sitaram evacuated most of the civilian population from the fort and sent his family to Kolkata.

Dayaram and Bux Ali Khan attacked the fort from the east and the south. After defending the fort for a long time, Sitaram was captured and Mohammadpur fell. Dayaram escorted him in chains to Murshidabad. At the trial, Sitaram was sentenced to death by Murshid Quli Khan and his relatives were imprisoned for life. His final rites were performed at the banks of Ganges in Murshidabad.

== Welfare ==
=== Water reservoirs ===
Sitaram constructed a number of water reservoirs in the capital to meet the need of drinking water for the fort, city and the adjacent villages. The most famous of them was the Ram Sagar, a rectangular lake measuring 2,400 feet (730 m) by 900 feet (270 m). It had a depth of about 20 feet (6.1 m). Even in the summer, it sustained a water level of at least 12 feet (3.7 m). The reservoir was treated to prevent against any algal bloom. Towards the west of the fort, in the village of Harekrishnapur, Sitaram constructed another lake called Krishna Sagar, measuring 1000 ft by 350 ft. The excavated earth was used to raise earthen embankments at some clearance around the lake in order to prevent the flood water from contaminating the tank.

To the west of Ram Sagar, towards the beels, Sitaram constructed another tank named Sukh Sagar. It was squarish in shape, with each side about 375 feet (114 m). At the centre, there was a three-story luxurious palace, which served as the summer retreat for the royal family. Mayurpankhi boats ferried them to the palace in the middle of the lake.

=== Temples ===
Sitaram came from a Shakta family, and was initiated into Shaktism in his early life. After setting up the capital at Mohammadpur, he erected a Dashabhuja Temple there. When he visited his father in Bhusna, he used to frequent the Gopinath Jiu akhada. Gradually, he became attracted to Vaishnavism, becoming a disciple of Krishna Vallabh Goswami of Murshidabad, who initiated him to the faith. Sitaram erected a pancharatna temple dedicated to Hare Krishna in the village of Kanainagar to the west of the fort at Mohammadpur.

== Marriages and children ==
Sitaram married the daughter of a Maulik Kayastha resident of Edilpore in Bhusna. She did not have any children, and very little is known about her. After obtaining the jagir of Naldi, Sitaram married Kamala, the daughter of a Kulin Kayastha, Saral Khan Ghosh, a resident of Das Palsha village in the district of Birbhum. Kamala became his principal wife and, when Sitaram became king, she became the king's consort. They had two sons, Shyamsundar and Surnarayan. Sitaram's third wife came from the village of Patuli, presently under Katwa sub-division of Burdwan district. Her name is not known. They had two sons, Bamdev and Jaydev. Both sons died in childhood.
