= Canadian Academic English Language Assessment =

The Canadian Academic English Language Assessment or CAEL (/keɪl/) is a standardized test designed to measure English language proficiency for admission to college and university, and for membership in professional associations. Test takers read articles, listen to a lecture, answer questions, and write a short essay, as they would be expected to do in a first-year university or college classroom.

The CAEL Assessment is accepted by over 180 academic institutions across Canada and the United States as well as to several international institutions. The test is also accepted at a number of professional organizations, including the Canadian Veterinary Association, the Royal Architectural Institute of Canada, and the Immigration Consultants of Canada Regulatory Council (ICCRC).

The CAEL Assessment is developed in Canada, by Canadians. It incorporates Canadian English and accents as used in Canadian academic contexts and post-secondary institutions. The CAEL Assessment is a fully integrated and topic-based performance test. Test takers use the information from the Reading and Listening components to write their essay.

In June 2015, Paragon Testing Enterprises, a Canadian English language testing company and a subsidiary of the University of British Columbia, acquired the CAEL Assessment from Carleton University.

== History ==
The CAEL Assessment was first developed by Carleton University in 1987. It was created out of a need to standardize the existing English language test given to students requiring a proficiency test as part of their admission to Carleton. However, in June 2015, Paragon Testing Enterprises, a subsidiary of The University of British Columbia (UBC), acquired the test.

Paragon currently administers three tests: the Canadian English Language Proficiency Index Program (CELPIP), the Canadian Academic English Language (CAEL) Assessment, and the Language Proficiency Index (LPI). The CELPIP Test is one of two tests designated by Immigration, Refugees and Citizenship Canada (IRCC) as proof of English language proficiency for permanent resident status in Canada and Canadian citizenship. With the acquisition of the CAEL Assessment, Paragon Testing Enterprises retired the CELPIP- Academic Test.

== Test format ==
The language tasks and activities in the CAEL Assessment are systematically sampled from those that are commonly undertaken within the university academic community. The content for the tasks are drawn from introductory university courses at times when professors are introducing new topics to their students with the expectation that the students know little or nothing about the content.

Topics for the CAEL Assessment are drawn from introductory university courses such as arts, sociology, anthropology, business, engineering, sports, law, and medicine. Possible topics include criminal behaviour, global warming, urban development, cultural diversity, weather systems, team management, competition, and organizational behaviour.

The total allotted test time is approximately 145 minutes (2 hours and 25 minutes). Some test centres offer the CAEL Assessment over 2 days, with the Written Assessment and the OLT held on separate days.

The CAEL Assessment has two parts: Part 1, the Written Assessment and Part 2, the Oral Language Test (OLT).

=== Written assessment ===
Written Assessment	Reading Section 1	25 minutes
Written Assessment	Listening Section	20 minutes
Written Assessment	Reading Section 2	30 minutes
Written Assessment	Writing Section	45 minutes

==== Reading ====
The time allotted for the Reading section is 55 minutes. Test takers are given two readings that are on the same topic as the Listening and Writing components.

The readings are taken from the following sources:

- First-year university textbooks
- Magazine and academic journal articles
- Brochures or information leaflets
- Newspaper articles
- Graphs and charts
- Government documents

Reading tasks include:

- Identifying main ideas
- Extracting specific information
- Understanding vocabulary in context
- Classifying information
- Following a logical or chronological sequence of events

==== Listening ====
The time allotted for the Listening section is 20 minutes. Test takers listen to a pre-recorded lecture and answer relevant questions on the same topic as the Reading and Writing components.

- The lecture is adapted from a first-year university course.
- The recording is played only once.
- While they listen, test takers take notes and answer questions related to the lecture.

Listening tasks include:

- Identifying main ideas
- Completing charts and diagrams
- Taking notes
- Sequencing information
- Filling in the blanks
- Recording specific information

==== Writing ====
The time allotted for the Writing section is 45 minutes. Test takers will use the information from the Reading and Listening components to write a short essay. It is encouraged that test takers plan their essays prior to writing.

- The essay is always the final task of the test
- The essay topic is always provided at the beginning of the test
- The essays are typically one to two pages in length

The essay topic asks the test taker to:

- Agree or disagree with a claim
- Argue for or against a position
- Discuss advantages and disadvantages of a course of action

=== Oral Language Test (OLT) ===
The time allotted for the Oral Language Test (OLT) is 25 minutes. The OLT is carried out on a computer equipped with a headset and microphone, however test takers will not be required to use the computer mouse or keyboard. The OLT may be taken before or after the Written Assessment.

It consists of five tasks which sample typified and recurring speech acts within college and university settings:

Task 1 (2 minutes)	Make a short oral presentation. Test takers are given the topic for the presentation upon registration in stage one and may take as much time as they like to prepare and practice their talk in advance of the test.
Task 2 (5 minutes)	Relay information obtained from a lecture. Test takers are asked to provide key information to another student based on their understanding of a short recorded segment of a professor's instructions.
Task 3 (5 minutes)	Relay information obtained from an academic document. Test takers are asked to provide specific information based on their reading of a short, generic academic document.
Task 4 (5 minutes)	Relay information from an academic text. Test takers are asked to read a section of the text in Task 3 aloud, for the purpose of discussing the text in the context of a group discussion or academic presentation.
Task 5 (8 minutes)	Explain a choice for participation in a group project. Test takers listen to a professor's instructions for a group oral presentation. Then they listen to other members of a group who explain their preferences for participation in the presentation. After listening to the other group members, the test takers are asked to explain their own presentation choice and ask a question regarding an important detail related to the presentation (e.g., time allowed, marking criteria, available equipment, etc.).

== Scoring ==
CAEL Assessment Scores are reported for Listening, Reading, Writing, and Speaking test components. The scores range from band level 10 to band level 90.

=== Band descriptors ===
Each band score corresponds to a descriptive statement summarizing the level of English language proficiency of a test taker.

80–90	Expert: demonstrates a level of competence, accuracy, and effectiveness in academic/professional settings
70	Adept: uses generally accurate language in most settings; some limitations in flexibility are evident
60	Advanced: displays competence in academic or professional settings
50	High Intermediate: exhibits some competence in academic or professional settings; communication may break down in places
40	Intermediate: demonstrates some ability to comprehend and articulate complex ideas and arguments typical of academic or professional settings
30	High Beginner: expresses basic ideas about familiar topics in routine settings
10–20	Low Beginner: communicates with limited ability

=== Interpretation of band scores ===
70–90	Meets university and college entry requirements
50–60	May meet entry requirements at some colleges and universities
10–40	Too low to meet entry requirements at any college or university

=== Results ===
Results of tests taken at Canadian test centres are available within 8 business days after the scheduled test date. However, the results of tests taken at international test locations are available within 20 business days after the scheduled test date.

Test takers’ test scores can be sent to five institutions, which is included in the registration fee. Institution details are provided by the test takers when registering online, or up to 4 days before the chosen test date. The official score reports will only be mailed to academic and professional institutions.

== Test centre locations and test dates ==
Test takers can currently take the CAEL Assessment at test centres across Canada and China.

The full list of test centres and their corresponding test dates is listed at the CAEL website: https://www.cael.ca/

== Institutions that accept CAEL ==
The CAEL Assessment is accepted by over 180 academic institutions across Canada and internationally as proof of English proficiency. A number of professional associations also recognize the CAEL Assessment as proof of English language proficiency required for membership.

Canadian Institutions
Alberta	Alberta College of Art & Design; Athabasca University; Bow Valley College; Burman University; Canadian University College; Concordia University of Edmonton; Keyano College; Lakeland College; Lethbridge College; MacEwan University; Mount Royal University; NorQuest College; Northern Alberta Institute of Technology; Northern Lakes College; Olds College; Portage College; Real Estate Council of Alberta (RECA); Red Deer College; Southern Alberta Institute of Technology; St. Mary's University; Taylor University College and Seminary; The King's University; University of Alberta; University of Calgary; University of Lethbridge
British Columbia	British Columbia Institute of Technology; Brighton College; Canadian Arts & Sciences Institute; Capilano University; College of the Rockies*; Columbia College; Coquitlam College; Douglas College; Emily Carr Institute of Art and Design; Fairleigh Dickinson University; Kwantlen Polytechnic University; Langara College; North Island College; Northern Lights College; Simon Fraser University*; Thompson Rivers University; University of the Fraser Valley; University of British Columbia; UBC Okanagan; UBC Vantage College; University of Northern British Columbia; University of Victoria; Vancouver Island University
Manitoba	Assiniboine Community College; Booth University College; Brandon University; Canadian Mennonite University; Manitoba Institute of Trades and Technology; Red River College; University of Manitoba; University of Winnipeg; University College of the North*
New Brunswick	Crandall University; McKenzie College School of Art & Design; Mount Allison University; New Brunswick College of Craft and Design; New Brunswick Community College; Oulton College; St. Stephen's University*; St. Thomas University; University of New Brunswick; Yorkville University
Newfoundland	College of the North Atlantic*; Fisheries and Marine Institute of Memorial University of Newfoundland; Memorial University of Newfoundland
Nova Scotia	Acadia University; Cape Breton University; Dalhousie University; Mount Saint Vincent University; NSCAD University; Nova Scotia Community College; Saint Mary's University; St. Francis Xavier University; University of King's College
Ontario	Algoma University; Algonquin College; Brescia University College; Brock University; Carleton University; Centennial College; College of Veterinarians of Ontario; Conestoga College Institute of Technology and Advanced Learning; Confederation College*; Durham College; Fanshawe College; Fleming College; George Brown College; Georgian College; Humber Institute of Technology and Advanced Learning*; Huron University College; Kemptville College; Lakehead University; Laurentian University; Loyalist College; McMaster University; Niagara College; Nipissing University; OCAD University; Queen's University; Redeemer University College; Renison University College; Ridgetown Campus-U Guelph; St. Clair College*; St. Jerome's University; St. Lawrence College; Saint Elizabeth Health Career Colleges; Sault College*; Seneca College of Applied Arts and Technology*; Toronto Metropolitan University; triOS College; Trent University; Trillium College; Trinity College*; University of Guelph; University of Guelph-Humber; University of Ontario Institute of Technology; University of Ottawa; University of Sudbury; University of Toronto; University of Waterloo; Western University; University of Windsor; Upper Canada College*; Victoria University; Wilfrid Laurier University; York University
Prince Edward Island	Holland College; University of Prince Edward Island
Quebec	Bishop's University; Canada College; Concordia University; Heritage College; McGill University
Saskatchewan	Campion College; Cumberland College (in partnership with SIAST); First Nations University of Canada; Great Plains College (in partnership with SIAST); Lakeland College; Luther College; Northlands College (in partnership with SIAST); North West College (in partnership with SIAST); Parkland College (in partnership with SIAST); Saskatchewan Polytechnic; Southeast College (in partnership with SIAST); St. Peter's College; St. Thomas More College; University of Regina; University of Saskatchewan

Professional Associations
- American Veterinary Medical Association
- Appletree Medical Group
- Canadian Veterinary Medical Association
- Immigration Consultants of Canada Regulatory Council (formerly CSIC)
- Ontario College Application Service
- Real Estate Council of Alberta (RECA)
- Real Estate Council of British Columbia (RECBC)*
- Royal Architectural Institute of Canada
- TESL Ontario

International Institutions
England	University of East Anglia*; University of London*
Scotland	University of Edinburgh
Sweden	Chalmers University of Technology; Linköping University; World Maritime University
The United States of America	Canisius College; City University of Seattle (Vancouver, BC Campus); Claremont Graduate University; Gonzaga University; Northwestern University; Rice University; San Francisco State University; Stanford University; University of Alaska; University at Buffalo; University of California, San Diego; University of Miami; University of Minnesota; University of North Texas; University of Oregon; University of Southern California; University of Washington; Yale University

*This institution accepts the CAEL Assessment but it is not recognized as an official English language proficiency test on their website.

== Other English language proficiency tests ==
Many post-secondary institutions in Canada and the United States of America require proof of English language proficiency as one of their admission requirements. The most common English language proficiency tests other than the CAEL Assessment include: the International English Language Testing System (IELTS), Test of English as a Foreign Language (TOEFL), the Michigan English Language Assessment Battery (MELAB), Test of English for International Communication (TOEIC), the Pearson Test of English Academic (PTE Academic), and more.

== See also ==
- Canadian English Language Proficiency Index Program (CELPIP)
- English Language Proficiency
- Immigration Consultants of Canada Regulatory Council (ICCRC)
- International English Language Testing System (IELTS)
- List of admission tests to colleges and universities
- Michigan English Language Assessment Battery (MELAB)
- Pearson Test of English Academic (PTE Academic)
- Test of English as a Foreign Language (TOEFL)
- Test of English for International Communication (TOEIC)
