= International students in Canada =

Canada was reported to have 997,820 international students at the end of 2024, a 4% decline over 2023. Other sources report that number as an underestimate, the true number being potentially as high as two million.

As early as 1959, Canada's then-monarch, Queen Elizabeth II, said on Dominion Day (now Canada Day), in reference to cooperation and mutual help, "one instance of this is the number of students from India, and Pakistan, and the West Indies who found places in Canadian universities. This is an admirable plan and I hope that it spreads [...] If any of these students are listening to me, which perhaps they are, I congratulate them on the hard work and enterprise which has sent them here and send them my very good wishes."

The provision of international student education is considered to have non-monetary benefits, such as reducing xenophobia and cultural stereotyping by encouraging diversity, nurturing international goodwill and global civility, fostering intercultural and social connections among faculty and students, and promoting greater engagement in teaching and collaborative research initiatives.

According to the International Education Strategy published by the Government of Canada, international students are present in all levels of education, including primary, secondary, trades, and college and post-secondary education, with the largest number of international students enrolled at the post-secondary level. The number of enrolled students has been increasing steadily in all levels from 2015 to 2018, with the greatest rise in college attendance.

In 2016, the International Education Division of Global Affairs Canada launched the EduCanada brand, a collaborative promotional initiative involving the provinces and territories and the Council of Ministers of Education, Canada. That same year, credible allegations of the "callous disregard for academic ethics and standards in a scramble by Canadian universities and colleges to sign up international students" was reported, citing a 2007 UNESCO report alleging widespread corruption in higher education. Canada's global anti-corruption ranking was downgraded from No. 8 to No. 12 in 2018, noting fraud and educational integrity breaches.

The International Education Strategy for the period 2019-2024 included a commitment to diversify inbound student population and distribute the population more evenly across the country. To attract more international students, Canadian educational institutes offered English as a second language (ESL) programs and reserved specific international student scholarships.

A 2020 survey conducted by the Canadian Bureau for International Education (CBIE) found that 96% of international students endorsed Canada as a study destination, due to its quality education and its reputation as a safe, tolerant and multicultural country that celebrates diversity.

Some private institutions are revoking their admission offers to international students because they do not have the capacity to accommodate large volumes of international students. They sent out more acceptance letters, thinking that the Immigration, Refugees and Citizenship Canada (IRCC) would manage the numbers. In 2022, information obtained through the Access to Information Act showed a significant increase in the influence of Indian students. They were pushing Canada to support their individual, economic, and political goals. Indian international student activism with similar aims were highly active on social media. Although Canada aims to capture the economic benefits of its knowledge-based economy by providing education to international students, it faces challenges in delivering the necessary services ethically and becoming a transformative leader. Additionally, the sector is influenced by consultants who advise prioritizing appearances over implementing substantial changes.

From January 2024, reforms and caps on the numbers of international students have been rolled out due to the strain on housing and social services, and abuse of the program and students by individuals and institutions.

== Statistics ==
=== Number of students ===
Reported total student population by year
Year	IRCC	GAC
2014	326,120	-
2015	350,130	457,828
2016	410,400	523,971
2017	494,525	-
2018	558,957	721,000
2019	642,480	-
2020	527,195	-
2021	616,585	-
2022	804,370	-
2023	1,040,985	-
2024	485,000	-

Figures for the international student population in Canada vary depending on the reporting agency. The IRCC only reports on the number of students with a valid work or study permit. Students who study for less than six months do not require a permit, which means that short-term students are not counted in IRCC statistics. The International Education Division of Global Affairs Canada (GAC) includes both short- and long-term students in their statistics, basing short-term numbers on data obtained from Languages Canada. By definition, this means that GAC numbers will be higher than those reported by IRCC.

The IRCC reports that as of December 2019, there were a total of 642,480 international students in Canada at all levels, representing a 13% increase from the previous year. Most international students are post-secondary students, with over 120,000 of college student permit holders reported in 2018 and the statistic released by GAC for 2018, reported 721,000 students. In 2022, there were 804,370 international students in Canada at year's end.

In addition to post-secondary education, Canadian high schools and primary schools also attract increasing numbers of international students. In 2000, GAC reported that there were 27,997 international students at the primary and secondary level. By 2010, this number had increased to 35,140. In 2017, CIBE, relying on IRCC numbers, reported 71,350 international students in the secondary and primary Canadian school systems.

The provinces with the highest international student populations are Ontario and British Columbia. In 2016, Ontario had the greatest number of international students in Canada, with 233,226 short- and long-term students representing 44.5% of all international students in the country. British Columbia had 145,691 students, representing 27.8% of the international student population. Quebec, Alberta, and Nova Scotia had the next three largest populations of international students.

=== Reduction in 2024 onward ===
An advisory panel assembled by Justin Trudeau's finance minister, Bill Morneau, in 2016, which included the founders of the Century Initiative, recommended Canada drastically increase immigration levels, focusing on business people and international students. The panel claimed higher levels of immigration would increase Canadians' income by $15,000 a year by 2030. In January 2024, Immigration Minister Marc Miller announced a cap of around 360,000 new permits, a decrease of almost 35%, in order to protect students from "bad actors" and relieve pressures on housing and services. In April, Miller clarified that the target was 485,000 approved study permits, but there was an allowance to accommodate existing students applying for an extension. In September 2024, the government announced the cap would be lowered by another 10% for 2025 and 2026 to 437,000 permits.

=== By percentage ===
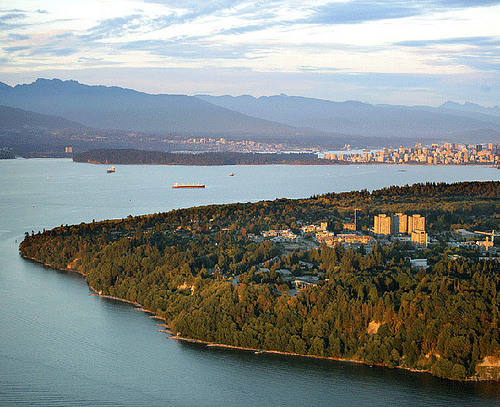
Aerial view of the Vancouver campus of the University of British Columbia

According to Maclean's, in 2016, the three universities with the highest enrollment of international students in first-year undergraduate studies were the University of British Columbia (31%), McGill University, (30.7%), and Bishop's University (29.6%). For graduate students overall, the universities with highest international enrollment were the University of Windsor (57.2%), Memorial University of Newfoundland (50%), and Concordia University (49.2%).

=== By numbers ===
According to the CBC, in 2023, the post-secondary institutions accounting for the greatest numbers of international study permits were Conestoga College of Ontario (30,395 permits), University Canada West of British Columbia (13,913), and Fanshawe College of Ontario (11,706).

=== Demographics ===
International students attending Canadian institutions are primarily coming from Asia and Africa.

Top 15 countries and regions sending students to Canada in 2024 are listed below.

Rank	Country/Territory	Number of Students	Per cent of Total
1	India	188,630	18.9%
2	China	56,405	5.6%
3	Nigeria	26,540	2.7%
4	Philippines	24,760	2.5%
5	France	13,770	1.4%
6	Iran	10,950	1.1%
7	Vietnam	10,550	1.1%
8	Nepal	9,440	0.9%
9	Algeria	9,275	0.9%
10	South Korea	8,485	0.9%
11	Mexico	8,375	0.8%
12	Ghana	7,780	0.8%
13	Brazil	7,015	0.7%
14	Colombia	6,855	0.7%
15	Bangladesh	6,530	0.7%
Others		602,460	60.4%
Total		997,820	100%

== Economic impact of students ==
The large number of international students studying in Canada contributes significantly to the Canadian economy. According to Global Affairs Canada, the economic impact can be felt across the entire country. In 2015, expenditures by international students, including tourism associated with visitors to the students, was worth $12.8 billion; in 2016, that figure had increased by 21.2% to $15.5 billion.

Long-term international students spent an estimated yearly average of $33,800 in 2015 and $35,100 in 2016. This figure includes expenses associated with education, as well as unrelated discretionary spending, but excludes money spent by visiting family and friends. In 2015, international student education created or supported 140,010 jobs (118,640 full-time equivalent), and in 2016, that increased to approximately 168,860 jobs (143,150 FTE). By 2022, the Canadian government reported that the annual economic contribution of international students had increased to $22.3 billion, greater than exports of auto parts, lumber or aircraft.

International student spending in Ontario contributed $5.04 billion to the provincial gross domestic product in 2015; this figure increased to $6.35 billion in 2016. The expenditures of international students supported 62,737 jobs in 2015, and 79,034 jobs in 2016. British Columbia also experienced an increase in their GDP from $2.39 billion in 2015 up to $2.76 in 2016. Over the same period, jobs supported by foreign enrollment in British Columbia increased from 35,294 to 40,499.

The economic effects of foreign students studying in Canada can be profound and varied. When it comes to consumer spending, international students spend their money on a variety of items such as housing, food, transit, rent, and other living costs. As of January 1, 2024, students must prove they have $20,635/year in financial support to be eligible to study in Canada.

The notable growth in international students from India has led to escalated tensions with Canada's large Indian Canadian community, who claim that students are "stealing their jobs" and "causing violence" within the established Indian enclaves of the country.

== Impact of post-secondary programs ==
Experts find a concerning trend wherein a significant portion of students from overseas are drawn to generic post-secondary programs, despite limited job prospects in those fields. These students often graduate from programs that offer minimal value in the job market, resulting in negligible lifetime earnings benefits. This constrains their ability to secure full-status employment, making them undesirable and under-qualified for respective job positions and unable to obtain the necessary professional licenses for their field. For example, one-year programs in areas such as autism and behavioral science or project management lack the credentials required for regulatory or professional body registration. This impedes graduates' prospects in finding work, their capacity to work effectively in relevant sectors, and their ability to deliver standardized services as per professional standards. This shift of focus in providing higher education for international students as a pathway for obtaining work permits rather than imparting essential skills for sustained productivity and integration into Canadian society has not only negatively impacted international students but also domestic students who seek to enhance their credentials for better job opportunities. Certain provincial governments, such as Ontario, are urging colleges to refocus on their core mission of providing post-secondary education and training that meets the needs of Canadians and supports the economic and social growth of their local communities. A survey revealed that international students often choose programs with generic courses that require less academic rigor but offer better student and work permit privileges. For example, Crandall University's Master of Management program does not include math-related courses that are usually part of such degrees. Consequently, programs like this, which are packed with generic courses, do not equip students with the employable skills necessary for those sectors. However, international students may select these programs to benefit from study permits, which allow them to bring their families and later work under the extended post-Master's work permits. Similarly, at Centennial College, academicians observe that some students choose fields like public relations primarily as a pathway to permanent residency rather than for career interests. They enroll in these programs to work long hours while on a study permit, network for an easier transition to permanent residency, or to engage in anti-home country protests and transnational activism to demonstrate that their political orientations prevent their safe return home, thus undermining the integrity of Canadian study permits. However, interviews with international students also reveal that the issue is not one-sided; Canada lacks high-quality educational programs. They note that even though Canada offers one-year programs, structurally these are not comparable to certain job-ready and value-oriented one-year programs available in the United Kingdom and United States. These concerns highlight a major shortcoming and underscore the need for prompt, forward-thinking reforms, job-focused curriculum, and ambitious vision in Canadian higher education. Moreover, international students are not obliged to maintain a certain level of grades during their studies to obtain post-graduate work permits, a measure which could be used as evidence of their genuine engagement as students.

In 2024, the government announced changes to the post-graduation work permit program, adjusting the lengths of permits based on the quality of enrolled programs and workforce demand in specific fields. This aims to address labor excess in low-demand sectors and increase the workforce in needed areas, marking the most significant update to the program since 2008. Data examined from 2018 to 2023 shows that Immigration, Refugees, and Citizenship Canada (IRCC) approved over 776,000 permits for students enrolling in programs categorized as "business/commerce" or "business management, marketing, and related support services," far surpassing those in in-demand academic fields. Experts caution that this increase in students pursuing business programs does not align with the country's labor market demands. They raise concerns that the rise in international student enrollment in business programs is primarily driven by the financial motives of educational institutions. The Minister responsible for IRCC in 2024 expressed disappointment in the provinces' failure to ensure that colleges and universities offer competent, employment-focused educational programs aligned with the job market. The absence of coordinated federal oversight to regulate the enrollment of international students in tertiary programs has not only worsened this issue but, per experts, also underscores the need for more cohesive and effective involvement in strategic planning and governance in the education sector.

In 2025, a government report surfaced stating that, given the current trajectory of post-secondary education becoming increasingly misaligned with the knowledge, skills, and abilities required to meet the demands of employers, the Canadian post-secondary education would, by 2040 or earlier, completely cease to be a pathway to social mobility. Instead, it would become a vanity credential that reinforces one's position within the elite social stratum.

== Work and residency ==
Students are able to work off-campus 24 hours a week when school is in session and unlimited hours during school breaks. During the COVID-19 pandemic, international students were permitted to work up to 40 hours per week to address the reluctance of the domestic population to work and ensure the uninterrupted provision of essential services. In fall 2023, the allowed number of work hours for foreign students was reverted to the standard limit of 20 hours per week. After graduating from any educational program, students can stay in Canada by applying for an open work permit lasting three years without any restrictions, known as the Post-Graduation Work Permit (PGWP). Through it, they naturally qualify for permanent residency. Then, if they wish to become permanent residents, they can do so through the available Permanent Residency Pathways. The Immigration, Refugees, and Citizenship plan for 2019-2020 aimed to primarily export Western values and import new ideas by offering educational opportunities to international students. Additionally, it was to position Canada at a competitive advantage in generating profitable economic returns, and to ensure a significant influx of either permanent or rotating tax-paying bodies. However, primarily it was to enable international students to acquire knowledge and skills to help create jobs and drive social changes in their home countries.

In 2022, experts in international student education found that Canada's approach to foreign students has shifted. It is no longer solely about uplifting the world's brightest minds or aiding developing nations. Instead, Canadian higher education has transformed into a business-driven endeavour, characterized by competitive marketing strategies. This shift has ignored the necessity of strengthening the Canadian workforce and its global competency. Both public and private educational institutions are pursuing the lucrative venture of providing international student education. This pursuit has transformed academic programs into products catering to and exploiting the post-study, open-work permit needs of international students rather than aligning with the job requirements of Canadians and addressing the country's labour market needs, especially for high-skilled workers. As part of addressing these unsustainable changes and the lack of capacity to accommodate explosive population growth, IRCC announced in 2024 that it would no longer support the eligibility of a post-graduation work permit upon graduation from an institute operating under a curriculum licensing arrangement, among other strategic decisions. A curriculum licensing arrangement involves satellite institutes or private colleges offering educational programs under a licensing agreement with public universities and colleges. The Minister responsible for IRCC stated that they are implementing these changes with the aim of mitigating "short-term gains for a lot of long-term pain," and ensuring overall sustainability.

In the 2010s, there was a shift in immigration policy due to small businesses claiming to need affordable labour, making student visas a step towards permanent residency, currently known as "two-step immigration". This led to a historic population growth in Canada up until 2022, affecting housing affordability and social services. Statistics Canada noted that 58% of this increase was due to temporary residents, including students. Moreover, a vast majority of these students are not enrolled or trained in fields where Canada needs to meet its labour demands. Currently, multi-year open work permits are granted to international students upon their graduation, regardless of whether their education matches Canada's labour market demands.

In June 2024, Canada revealed a new plan for transitioning more international students to permanent residents by offering work permits that extend beyond the current maximum of three years, even for international students who have studied for just a year in certain programs. The plan aims to provide more years of stay through open work permits until international students are able to integrate into the Canadian job market and to recognize international students' engagement in the service industry while being temporary residents within the immigration points system. It also includes allowing them more time to stay in the country while going through the recognition of their educational qualifications by online submission. These relaxed and added benefits would be available to individuals who engage in specific short-term studies, spanning one to two years, at colleges and diploma mills in areas where Canada needs to build a strong service sector and a second-class citizen workforce. This approach makes the already fuzzy definition of the transient visa category even fuzzier and strongly signals that seeking international education in Canada is a pathway to permanent residency and citizenship. It does so by increasing the number of years on open work permits available to international students post-study, relaxing requirements for their permanent residency, and providing more points for temporary residents' permanent residency compared to offshore skilled immigrant applicants. Additionally, the plan highlights the lack of the liberal government's consistent interest in empowering Canadian students or unemployed citizens registered with employment agencies to enter these job sectors through subsidized and quality education. Reports from these employment agencies reveal they have a higher number of cases with a large number who are unable to get in touch with a caseworker, and that they are unable to cater to them in a way that improves their quality of life. Meanwhile, Statistics Canada reports say Canada in June 2024 is leading with a 6.4% unemployment rate, the highest in over two years, especially because the labour market struggles to absorb a rapidly swelling population. Despite these challenges, a report shows that Canada has been increasingly issuing study permits in early 2024 compared to early 2023, from 165,805 to 187,510, representing an increase of approximately 14%. Furthermore, the immigration department has revealed plans to spread francophone speakers outside Quebec by lowering points and relaxing requirements for permanent residency compared to anglophone speakers.

In September 2024, the government announced new regulations, effective from November 2024, to align with international education standards in other English-speaking countries and to emphasize a renewed political focus on serving Canadians after consecutive by-election losses. The regulations state that students starting their studies after November 2024 in programs not related to occupations facing long-term shortages in Canada will no longer be eligible for post-graduate work permits. The changes aim to prevent the misuse of the international education system for residency and work purposes while addressing broader exploitation of international students and the socioeconomic pressures they create. However, provincial college representatives, international student advocates, and educational agencies strongly oppose the changes, arguing that they are economically unfair and detrimental to those who came seeking residency. Some critics warn that these rules could result in the loss of valuable future workers and weaken Canada's position in the global education market. Additionally, the government has introduced a requirement for students to demonstrate a modest level of English proficiency, requiring only partial command of the language to qualify for post-graduate work permits, a standard less stringent than in other English-speaking countries. The list of long-term skill shortages is also lenient, supporting community colleges that offer short-term programs to international students leading to insecure, low-paying jobs. Furthermore, the government has chosen not to require proof of compliance with restricted work hours when processing inland applications, giving students flexibility to manage educational expenses, possibly influenced by unethical agents in the international education sector. These gradual and delayed changes aim to curtail bad actors in the sector while pushing educational institutions to revise their strategies to better support Canada's national and regional growth goals. Some observers note that this shift in government policy is not solely due to current challenges but reflects a long-term plan that began with a $148 million EduCanada campaign launched in 2016, which officially ended in 2024.

== Asylum claims ==
In 2024, the Immigration, Refugees and Citizenship Canada (IRCC) reported a pronounced trend in which international students were increasingly and alarmingly requesting asylum. To illustrate the pattern, they cited two noteworthy examples: between 2022 and 2023, the number of asylum claims submitted by students and graduates from Seneca Polytechnic surged from 300 to 700, while those from Conestoga College increased from 106 to 450. This data further highlights the challenges in higher education provided to international students and their actual capacity to fulfill legitimate labour shortages. This practice potentially has a more negative impact on their home countries and conflicts with their initial intention of being genuine students seeking quality education in Canada. In recent years, there has been considerable concern about how well international graduates are faring during their post graduation work permit phase. Some investigative journalists reveal that most international graduates on post-graduate work permits are not successful in Canada in achieving upward socioeconomic mobility with their Canadian education, and are either commandeering low-qualification jobs that previously sustained middle-class Canadian families, evidenced by 40% of their representation in new economic-class immigrants, or are stuck in low-skilled, low-paying jobs.

In January 2024, Immigration Minister Marc Miller announced the number of international student permits would be decreased due to the strain on housing and social services and the misuse of the program. Further limits were announced in September 2024. Miller also acknowledged the increasing number of international students requesting asylum within their first year in Canada, claiming there was "opportunism...being used and exploited there." The Government of Canada offers asylum to individuals who have a legitimate fear of persecution in their home country, and permanently remove individuals who apply under false pretenses. He noted that the claims were coming primarily from India, Nigeria, Ghana, Guinea, and the Democratic Republic of Congo, where there had been no significant changes in the countries since the students' arrival in Canada. Miller directed the College of Immigration and Citizenship Consultants (CICC) to crackdown on immigration consultants charging students up to $7000 to direct them into filing false claims. Miller stated some reasons students were giving when requesting asylum were "less valid than others" and that some students were using it as a ploy to have their tuition fees lowered to Canadian rates. He added the international student program was to promote “international excellence" and was not to be used as "a backdoor entry into Canada for whatever reason." He further stated, "The reality is that not everyone who wants to come to Canada will be able to—just like not everyone who wants to stay in Canada will be able to.” In September 2024, rents in Vancouver and Toronto dropped, largely believed to be a result of the caps.

At a virtual Toronto Metropolitan University panel in 2024, Miller stated that a few students who could not find work, or received a poor education from the institution of their choice, were filing claims, but this practice was "uncommon." Reasons for requesting asylum, such as sexual orientation, difference in political opinion, and the risk of gender or domestic violence, are recognized under the Refugee Convention. A refugee specialist with the Kitchener-Waterloo Multicultural Centre, commented on the increase in asylum claims, stating she was worried misinformation was prompting students to request asylum. “I think it would be very important if the professors at the college and for other services in the community to be aware of the refugee claim process because sometimes they give the wrong information to people,” she stated. An immigration lawyer stated the cost of living was behind the increase, as students lose their student permits when they cannot afford to pay tuition then drop out. A sharp increase in international students accessing food banks was also noticed by the end of 2023. Starting January 1, 2024, the government more than doubled the amount individuals applying for study permits needed to prove they had access to, from $10,000 to at least $20,635. This amount was in addition to their first year of tuition and travel costs.

In March 2024, Marc Miller also announced that his government was returning to the core elements of the Liberal Party of Canada's immigration strategy, supporting the transition of temporary residents into permanent residents through more domestic draws. Reaffirming the government's tacit policy regarding student visa immigration as an unofficially accredited pathway for permanent residency, among its other temporary resident entry pathways.

Global News reported in May 2025, that 20,245 asylum claims by international students were filed in 2024, and by the end of March 2025, 5,500 asylum claims had already been logged.

== Ethical concerns and misuse ==
The commodification of Canadian education accelerated in the early 2000s as academic and ethical standards were abandoned to increase international enrolment. Canada aimed to attract a larger share of financial streams from international nations to sustain the viability of its education system and to better compete with other top host countries such as the U.S., the U.K., and Australia for international students and their spending dollars. To achieve this, the federal government made several changes to Canada's immigration rules, effectively making it easier for international students to qualify for permanent residency, particularly by allowing them to stay and work after graduation through open work permits.

For some years, the economic motive was disguised using efficient public relations, the respective authorities claimed that the changes were made to promote cultural diversity and make Canada a more inclusive destination. The expanded prospects for profit and reduced oversight have heightened the economic interests of universities and colleges, resulting in a multitude of ethical issues, including increased collaborations with private institutions. These problems collectively undermine the integrity and quality of the Canadian post-secondary education system. However, the federal government has largely overlooked these concerns because international students both keep the post-secondary institutions financially afloat and offset the labor shortages in low-skilled sectors, with concerns parochially regarded as inconsequential.

The shift of Canadian post-secondary institutions from public-serving entities to profit-oriented businesses has raised significant ethical concerns and led to widespread instances of misuse. In 2019, the Toronto Star and St. Catharines Standard collaborated to produce an investigative series about international students called "The Price of Admission", which examined industry costs, academic performance, exploitation for profit, and other aspects of the industry.

Canadian magazine The Walrus published an investigative piece in 2021 which looked at potential exploitation faced by international students in Canada due to difficulties meeting their financial needs. A 2019 report by Statistics Canada revealed that approximately 1 in 3 student permit holders residing in Canada are not currently enrolled in schools, raising concerns about potential instances of misuse of temporary residency privileges. Specific measures to address this issue have been hindered by the lack of comprehensive data on individuals tied to temporary social insurance number.

According to a report by The Globe and Mail, there are several issues with student recruitment in India, imposing multiple challenges on international students in Canada. Lawyer Mario D. Bellissimo provided a legal analysis in an interview with CBC Radio's The Current, highlighting limitations and proposing changes to the international student system. Many businesses in India send a large number of students to Canada each year, promising them a new life, job opportunities, and a chance at Canadian citizenship. They found colleges and universities in Canada lack adequate infrastructure to support students. The surge in the student population has led to a shortage of purpose-built rentals in cities like Brampton, resulting in students living in overcrowded and unsafe accommodations. The hidden network of rental market also posed more risks to student safety and well-being.

It was also found out that students struggle to pay their college fees and are pressurized to maintain the illusion of thriving, leading them to borrow money and face financial pressures. The report highlighted misuse and other issues with recruitment practices and about the challenges faced by international students in Canada, particularly in terms of housing and assimilation. The Vancouver Sun reported open presence of street hawkers in Western Canada offering immigration services to desperate individuals seeking permanent residency. These agents promise visas and Canadian passports for large sums, provide false hopes and misleading information, and misrepresents study visa program as an easy route for chain migration of relatives and permanent residency. This has led to disappointment and wasted resources for clients.

Shady agreements involving spousal jobs as a pathway to permanent residency have also resulted in an unexpected increase in the number of dependents accompanying international students to Canada, as per the immigration statistics. Alongside scams involving visitor's visas, they run illicit schemes that use provincial immigrant entrepreneur programs. Some media have reported an increasing problem with international students committing suicide, particularly during the COVID-19 pandemic.

Some immigration specialists raise concerns that the unrestricted granting of student visas in Canada could lead to a difficult situation similar to that faced by Germany and the United States. Germany had to grant amnesty to millions of temporary workers, and the U.S. is grappling with the fate of undocumented "Dreamers." Additionally, the increased admittance of international students has contributed to Canada's housing crisis, impacting the poorest and most marginalized communities. Renters, who typically have lower incomes, struggle to find affordable housing and jobs due to competition with foreign students, leading them to forced relocations from their hometowns. Institutions' unregulated pursuit of profits by admitting more foreign students has been widely reported to exacerbate the housing affordability issue.

A reported, growing, and unfettered trend is education consultants advising international students to first enter the country to pursue any available one-year educational programs, bypassing potential issues with student visa sanctions and accessibility to educational programs. By doing so, they can subsequently enroll in additional year-long or multi-year-long programs as on-shore international students, typically with education providers who have up-scaled their operations and offer an unregulated number of generic, poor-quality programs. As an onshore international student, there is less scrutiny in gaining extended study permits for long-term post-study work permits.

International students are not required to undergo a genuine student assessment to access consecutive educational programs. They are not obliged to provide bank statements to prove their primary intent was to study rather than work, demonstrate full payment of fees, or submit the required proof of fixed deposit and its source for their means of stay. Additionally, they do not have to leave at the end of their first approved maximum continuous stay for a specific amount of time to honor their initial written agreement. Hence, students are able to obtain multi-year visas and open work rights, allowing them to extend their stay and studies for more years, facilitating their primary intention of staying for longer periods in Canada.

Canadian international student education providers are welcoming to this kind of business because there are no checks and balances that disallow them from providing it due to the inefficient system and policies. This trend further raises doubts about the integrity of providing an unregulated number of student visas or extensions of it.

Reports in 2024 about the resurgence of jobs-for-sale activities by unscrupulous Canadians seeking to game the inefficient immigration system for unethical profit-making, and the growing and unblocked trend of educational consultants misleading international students graduate visa route as a pathway for remaining permanently in Canada raise the integrity of providing work permits to international students who already have the opportunity to gain Canadian experience relevant to their education as genuine students during co-op placements, in a full-time capacity during their summer breaks, and in a part-time capacity as temporary residents.

Until 2014, international students were able to receive study permits from almost any educational institution, including unaccredited institutions, and only had to show their intention to study while in Canada. Students could remain in Canada by extending their study permit through a series of studies, until they are able to achieve their full legal status. According to a 2006 report by Canada Border Services Agency (CBSA), study permits had been exploited by parties linked to organized crime to enable them to enter Canada. Regulations were changed in 2014 to limit study permits to "designated learning institutions," and students had to show that they were actively pursuing studies. Incidents of fraudulent student visas still occur, and may be associated with human trafficking.

In late 2024 India's Enforcement Directorate alleged widespread human trafficking of international students by Canadian colleges. A subsequent investigation by the Globe and Mail showed nearly 50,000 student visa holders did not report to their Canadian School over two months in spring 2024.

== Incidents ==
Incidents involving and/or impacting international students
Incident	Date/Period	Summary	Ref.
400 students asked to re-take tests	December 2018	Over 400 students in India admitted to Niagara College's 2019 January term were asked by the college to re-take their IELTS tests after a probe claimed to find inconsistencies in language proficiency.	
Montreal college closures	February 2022	Between 1700 and 2000 international students, mostly from India, were left stranded due to the shutting down of three Quebec-based colleges (CCSQ College, M. College, and CDE College) that collected millions of dollars in fees before declaring bankruptcy. The Indian High Commission in Ottawa issued an advisory for the students impacted.	
Enrolment suspension by Ontario college	May 2022	In May 2022, Alpha College of Business and Technology, based in Scarborough, unilaterally suspended enrolments for its spring term, leaving hundreds of international students who paid thousands of dollars in tuition fees, uncertain. The incident sparked protest following which the college resumed enrolment.	
$245,000 automated phone scam	October 2022	Extortion scams using automated phone messaging targeted Chinese students in Waterloo, with regional police reporting the loss of at least $245,000 in the fraud.	
Anti-Ukrainian harassment	January 2023	Ukrainian student groups at University of Victoria and Carleton University raised concerns over targeted harassment of Ukrainians by specific groups operating out of their campuses.	
700 students facing deportation	March 2023	Around 700 Punjabi students received deportation letters from the Canada Border Services Agency (CBSA). All 700 students had applied for study visas via a migration agency headed by Brijesh Mishra, based in Jalandhar, Punjab. The agent was stripped off his license and reportedly fled after the news concerning the deportation broke out.	
Canadore College protest	September 2023	International students from Canadore College protested high tuition and housing costs by holding a demonstration outside the college. Some of the students had been sleeping in tents outdoors because student housing was full and local renting opportunities were scarce. The college agreed to arrange affordable rental housing, refund the housing fee, and to provide online classes.	
Protests in Prince Edward Island over work permit ineligibility	May 2024	Current and former international students in Prince Edward Island staged protests against provincial and federal governments. The protests highlighted changes to policies for international student work permits. The protesters presented letters to MLAs from local employers asking to exclude individuals already in PEI from new policies. Critics pointed to students focus on permanent residency rather than studies.	
Student protests across Ontario against rampant institutional malpractice	August 2024	International students enrolled in business administration and management programs at institutions across Ontario are accusing certain departments of deliberately failing them to increase revenue through dishonest academic practices. They attribute this to a historic lack of accountability systems to ensure ethical standards and quality assurance from academic staff, making students vulnerable to exploitation. The students also claim that recent concerns over declining enrollment in these programs have contributed to profit-driven decisions by these departments.	
India's Enforcement Directorate alleges widespread human trafficking of international students	December 2024	Following an investigation by India's Enforcement Directorate, it was alleged over one hundred Canadian colleges are implicated in human trafficking of international students through connections with two entities in Mumbai. Allegations that students are obtaining visas to Canadian colleges they never attend, before crossing the border illegally into the US. Canadian experts cite a lack of oversight of college's student visa processes.	
