= Immigration consultant =

An immigration consultant or a migration agent is an advisor that assists people who want to emigrate from one country to another, and supports their legal and documentation processes.

Immigration consultants may or may not have legal expertise about immigration laws and visa laws and about procedures for obtaining different types of visas, as the designation is regulated by some, but not all, governments. In Australia, only registered migration agents, Australian legal practitioners or an exempt person can lawfully give immigration assistance in Australia. In the United States, immigration consultants/notaries are not required to have formal immigration law training and are not allowed to answer even the most basic immigration legal questions. Doing so would constitute unauthorized practice of law, which is a crime. Because of this, many organizations including the Central America Resource Center recommend that all persons seeking immigration assistance completely avoid notaries and immigration consultants and, instead, seek legal advice from a licensed attorney. On the other hand, Canada provides certification as a Regulated Canadian Immigration Consultant through the College of Immigration and Citizenship Consultants, and Australia provides it through the Migration Agents Registration Authority.
