= Murder of Shao Tong =

2014 murder in Iowa; defendant convicted in China

Coordinates: 41.63539°N 91.49937°W

Shao Tong
- 邵童
- Shao's Facebook profile photo
- Born: November 12, 1994; Dalian, Liaoning, China
- Disappeared: September 6, 2014 (aged 19); Nevada, Iowa, U.S.
- Cause of death: Asphyxia, blunt force trauma
- Body discovered: September 26, 2014, Iowa City, Iowa

On September 26, 2014, police found a body later identified as 19-year-old Shao Tong (Chinese: 邵童, November 1994 – September 2014), a Chinese undergraduate at Iowa State University (ISU), in the trunk of a car registered in her name parked in an apartment complex on the outskirts of Iowa City, Iowa. She had been reported missing nine days earlier. The cause of death was found to be homicide by suffocation.

Shao had last been seen on September 7 at a hotel outside Nevada, Iowa, a small town east of Ames, where ISU is located. She had been spending the weekend there with her boyfriend, Li Xiangnan (Chinese: 李向南), a student at the University of Iowa, located in Iowa City. Her car and body were in the apartment complex he lived in.

Li was not present. Police believe that after abruptly checking out of the hotel the following morning, he had used her phone to text her friends that she was going to be away for a while and that Li had to return to China for a family emergency. While there was no evidence of Shao's purported travel, Li had flown back to Beijing, but beyond that point his whereabouts were unknown.

Early in 2015, authorities in Johnson County charged Li with first-degree murder and obtained an arrest warrant. Chinese Internet users began circulating pictures of Li, who remained at large. After Chinese detectives traveled to Iowa to visit the crime scene and review evidence, they too charged Li with intentional murder under Chinese law, which allows the prosecution of any Chinese citizen for a crime even if it occurred abroad. He surrendered to police in his native Wenzhou in May. The case was prosecuted there, since not only is there no extradition treaty between China and the United States, China does not extradite its own citizens. In March 2016, he pleaded guilty; three months later, he was given a life sentence, which could be reduced to a prison term of no less than 13 years.

== Background ==
Shao was born in the coastal Chinese city of Dalian in 1994, the only child of a family typical of China's emerging middle class. Her father was a civil servant who worked in food safety inspection and her mother was a homemaker. Shao attended Dalian Yuming High School and aspired to become a biologist.

Yuming students routinely perform well on China's National Higher Education Entrance Examination or gaokao, and in the Olympic Competition, which offers winners admission to college without having to take the gaokao. In the late 2000s, Shao and her then boyfriend entered the competition. He won and attended a prestigious university in southern China; she did not.

She decided to study in the U.S. instead, which she was able to do because her parents had saved over US$100,000 toward her education. In 2011 she went to Beijing to take a preparatory course for the Test of English as a Foreign Language. There she met Li Xiangnan, three years her senior, from Wenzhou. Shao's mother said he developed a crush on her daughter, which was not unusual—many other young men had shown such an interest in her daughter. She met him once when he came to Dalian, and recalled him as shy. Although he seemed to be from a rich background, she and her husband did not think he was right for their daughter.

Shao was accepted at Iowa State University (ISU), in Ames, where she majored in chemical engineering in 2012, a choice that pleased her father, since not many women enter that field. Li "chased [her] from China to the U.S," an acquaintance said, transferring from Rochester Institute of Technology to the University of Iowa in Iowa City, 140 miles (230 km) away, where he studied business. At Iowa State, friends, mostly fellow Chinese students, recalled her as being very outgoing, tutoring students in Chinese and dancing at parties. She also distinguished herself for her ability to solve Rubik's Cube quickly. Although engineering was not her favorite subject, she maintained a grade point average of 3.75.

Li and Shao continued to socialize in Iowa. According to her friends, he seemed to believe he was her boyfriend, although others who knew her said she had ongoing relationships with other men as well, not all of whom were aware of the others. He moved in with her in summer 2013, to the great annoyance of her roommate. "He didn't clean up. It's just not normal that a boy lived in a girl's dorm," she told a Chinese news outlet. "We tried to kick him out, but he wouldn't leave." In early 2014, he gave Shao's address as his on two occasions when he was cited for traffic violations while driving his 2009 BMW in Coralville, outside Iowa City.

Shao's other friends shared the same low opinion of Li, to the point that Shao avoided talking about him in their presence. A cousin in China noted that on visits home, Shao seemed more withdrawn than she had been in the past.

== Disappearance ==
On September 3, 2014, Karen Yang, a friend of Li, got a call from him. Li said that he had called Shao, and he could hear her conversing with another boy about him, making disparaging remarks. After calling Yang, he posted "fuck my life" in Chinese to his page on Renren, a social networking site popular with Chinese college students. It was his last post to the site.

Despite this, Li and Shao took advantage of the ensuing weekend to spend some time together. Since his presence was not desired by her roommates, they got into the 1997 Toyota Camry she had bought during a summer internship in Kentucky and checked into the Budget Inn off U.S. Route 30 near Nevada, Iowa, a small town east of Ames, on September 5. The hotel owner, Ken Patel, recognized them from two earlier stays over holiday weekends.

The following night, Patel says he saw Shao come to the lobby alone. It would be the last time anyone other than Li saw her alive. On the morning of September 7, Patel said that he woke and saw that Shao's gold car, in which the two had come from Ames, was already gone. This was unusual, he later stated, because on the couple's previous stays he had had to go to their room after they missed the 11 a.m. checkout time. While the hotel had a security camera on constantly, its feed was not recorded anywhere.

That night, Shao's father sent a text to her phone from China. He wanted to know if she had had any success replacing a pair of glasses she had told him several days earlier that she had lost. The responding text said that she had borrowed a pair from a friend. He asked if they could video chat, but she said she was too busy at the time. In retrospect he believes that those messages actually came from Li.

Another text, purportedly from Shao, was sent from Li's phone to one of Shao's roommates. It said that Li was going back to China due to an "emergency" and that Shao was going to take a bus to Minnesota and visit some friends from China there in the next week. The following day, Karen Yang sent Li a text asking how things were going with Shao. "Fine for now," he responded.

A week later, on September 16, Li's birthday, Yang sent him a text. He did not respond. "He was never like that," she recalled later to a Chinese publication. "He replied [to] messages promptly." She began to suspect that something was wrong.

Around that time, Shao's roommates began to wonder when she was planning to return as the week had passed and they had not heard from her. Through social media, they contacted her friends in Minnesota. None of them had seen her. "That's when we started to get really worried," one said. They reported her missing to Ames police on September 18.

== Discovery of body ==
Ames police were unable to find any evidence that Shao had taken a bus to Minnesota. They searched Shao's apartment the following week. They found a receipt for the Toyota Camry Shao had purchased in Kentucky, which still had that state's license plates on it. On September 26, they made the description and plate number of the car available to other police departments.

Police in Iowa City had also obtained a search warrant for Li's BMW the previous week, parked near his apartment off U.S. Route 6 on the eastern outskirts of the city. On the evening that their Ames counterparts posted the information about Shao's car, they found it nearby. Residents of the complex said it had been there for some time, and complained of the smell emanating from it. After a warrant was obtained, police found a body in the trunk, its decomposition accelerated by exposure to the late summer heat. It was later confirmed to be Shao.

== Investigation ==
Police immediately called the death suspicious. The autopsy found the cause of death to be asphyxiation and blunt force trauma, likely inflicted by another person. It did not fix a time of death beyond that when her body was discovered, due to the lack of information about the circumstances in which it had occurred. Her head was found wrapped tightly in a towel consistent with those at the Nevada Budget Inn where she and Li had stayed, and next to the body in the trunk was a 15-pound (6.8 kg) barbell.

Also in the trunk were travel documents showing that on September 6, Li had booked a flight from Eastern Iowa Airport in nearby Cedar Rapids to Chicago and then to Beijing. Cell phone records showed that the texts to Shao's friends had been sent from Chicago while he was on a layover there between flights. In Li's apartment, police found further evidence suggesting a hasty departure. Groceries had not been put away, an open container of milk had been left on a counter long enough for it to have spoiled, and luggage had been left behind.

Three days after the body was discovered, a search warrant was executed on the hotel room in Nevada that Li and Shao had shared. In it they found "splatters and drips of various dried liquids," which they sought to test to see if they had been human bodily fluids. They came to believe that Shao had been murdered at the hotel before her body was placed in the trunk of her car and driven to the parking lot of Li's apartment complex in Iowa City.

Upon further investigation, police learned of Li's September 3 "fuck my life" social-media post and the circumstances that gave rise to it. A Chinese friend of Li's in Iowa also reported that at a party a month before Shao's disappearance, Li had asked how long it would take the police to know if a person was missing. They found this odd because his question had no relation to the conversation they had been having. Iowa City police soon named Li a person of interest in the case.

Police were unable to locate Li so they could talk to him, believing that, as the evidence suggested, he had returned to China. They later received confirmation that he had cleared customs in Beijing on September 10. Since then there had been no record of him anywhere in China or elsewhere.

Chinese media had been following the case closely, since Chinese parents who send their children overseas to attend college are very concerned for their safety. Users on the Chinese social media sites Sina Weibo and WeChat had begun circulating Li's picture and other identifying information along with the hashtag #FindLi. In a two-day period there were 150,000 posts related to the case, receiving 2.2 million views. A reporter in Li's hometown of Wenzhou said his newspaper had called two local phone numbers looking for Li; at the one which was answered, the person on the other end hung up when asked about him. The same reporter said in a WeChat post that his colleagues could not say whether Chinese police were looking for Li as well.

== Arrest and charges ==
In an April 2015 CNN article about the case, Shao's father asked that Chinese and American authorities cooperate and share information to help capture Li and bring him to trial. He said that a few weeks earlier, the Iowa City police had told him that the Johnson County district attorney's office had charged Li with first-degree murder and issued an arrest warrant. Under Iowa law, prosecutors may in certain circumstances keep the existence of a warrant and any related indictment secret until after the arrest is made, and they did not confirm whether they had done so in Li's case.

Cooperation between the Chinese and American police did eventually increase. The Wenzhou police began monitoring Li around the same time. While they were occasionally able to find his whereabouts, he usually disappeared before they could get him under surveillance. They also lacked any evidence to charge him, since they were waiting for information from Iowa.

Later in April, investigators from China flew to Iowa and, accompanied by their American counterparts, interviewed witnesses and studied the crime scene. They returned to China with this evidence. In mid-May Li turned himself in to authorities in Wenzhou. Using the evidence from Iowa, agents from the Bureau of Criminal Investigation developed a case against him while Li remained in detention. At the end of June the Ministry of Public Security announced Li's formal arrest on a charge of intentional murder.

Li faced execution. Under Iowa law, the mandatory sentence would be life without parole.

Shao's father said he had been told that Li would be tried in China even though the crime occurred in the United States. The two countries do not have an extradition treaty, and China does not extradite its own citizens. It was not be the first such case in recent history: in 2010, a Shanghai court convicted Xiao Zhen of murdering a taxi driver in Auckland, New Zealand, before fleeing to China. Police in New Zealand shared their evidence with their Chinese counterparts only on the condition that Xiao would not be sentenced to death, since their country had abolished capital punishment.

The case also recalled the similar murder of Amanda Zhao in the Canadian province of British Columbia. Zhao had been killed by her boyfriend, Li Jiaming, while attending Coquitlam College. He reported her missing; ten days later, hikers found her body stuffed in a suitcase near Stave Lake, 60 miles (97 km) away. Li and another Chinese student came under suspicion and returned to China, where he was arrested but released for lack of evidence. Meanwhile, the Royal Canadian Mounted Police had built a case against him that led to a murder charge in Canada against Li and an accomplice. They would not share the evidence with their Chinese counterparts out of concerns, similar to those that attended the Xiao investigation in New Zealand, that Li would be sentenced to death if convicted. Eventually those concerns were resolved, and the two were charged in 2009. He was convicted three years later and sentenced to life, but on appeal in 2014 the Supreme People's Court reduced the conviction to manslaughter and the sentence to 7 years, accepting Li's argument that the death was the result of a pillow fight that got too vigorous.

== Trial ==
In March 2016, Li pleaded guilty to the charge in Intermediate People's Court in Wenzhou. He called his act "irrational and impulsive," saying he had loved her but was unable to deal with her having affairs with other men. However, he denied that he had planned the crime in advance, saying he had bought the plane ticket a few days in advance because he intended to go back to China in any event due to the stress he was feeling. Li begged the court for leniency on these grounds. He faced a sentence that could range from ten years in prison to death. His parents have paid the Shaos CN¥2 million, approximately US$300,000, in compensation.

Investigators from Iowa traveled to China to witness the proceedings. After they returned to Iowa, they revealed more details about the case in a news conference. They were still unsure about when exactly Shao had died, believing it most likely that she had survived Li's initial beating only to suffocate after he stuffed her body into a suitcase and put it into her trunk. Despite Li's claims in court that it was a crime of passion, the Iowa investigators believed instead that he had planned the killing in advance, and that his original plan was to put weights in the suitcase and sink it in the Skunk River. However, the shallowness of the river made that impossible. In August, Li was sentenced to life imprisonment.

== See also ==
- Crime in Iowa
- Deaths in September 2014
- Disappearance of Bethany Decker, 2011 Virginia missing-person case where friends of victim believe someone was trying to impersonate her on social media after she was last seen.
- Lists of solved missing person cases

=== Other homicides by Chinese abroad tried in China ===
- Trial of Xiao Zhen, in New Zealand
- Zhang Hongjie, a Chinese student in Australia whose death went unnoticed for seven months as her boyfriend, believed to have killed her, sent messages to her friends and family claiming to be her, then fled to China after the body was finally discovered.
- Fukuoka family murder case, committed by three Chinese students, Wei Wei, Yang Ning, and Wang Liang, in Japan. Wei Wei was tried in Japan, sentenced to death, and executed on December 26, 2019, at the age of 40. Yang Ning and Wang Liang fled to China, where they faced murder charges. Yang was sentenced to death and Wang was sentenced to life in prison. Yang was executed on July 12, 2005, at the age of 25.
