= Xiao Zhen =

Xiao Zhen may refer to:

- Xiao Zhen (footballer, born 1976), Chinese female footballer
- Xiao Zhen (footballer, born 1987), Chinese male footballer
- Xiao Zhen, convicted murderer, see Trial of Xiao Zhen
