= Murder of Amanda Zhao =

Chinese murder victim (c. 1981–2002)

Amanda Zhao
- Born: Zhao Wei; February 28, 1981; Shaanxi, China
- Died: c. October 7, 2002 (aged 21); Burnaby, British Columbia
- Cause of death: Homicide (strangulation)
- Body discovered: October 20, 2002; Stave Lake, British Columbia
- Education: Coquitlam College
- Occupation: Student

Amanda Zhao Wei (simplified Chinese: 赵巍; traditional Chinese: 趙巍; pinyin: Zhào Wēi) (28 February 1981 – 7 October 2002) was a Chinese student in Vancouver, British Columbia, Canada, who was murdered in October 2002. Zhao was studying English at Coquitlam College when she was reported missing on October 9, 2002, and her body was found inside a suitcase by hikers near Stave Lake on October 20, 2002, where an autopsy revealed that Zhao had been strangled to death.

Zhao's boyfriend Li Ang (李昂) was the prime suspect. Li was arrested in China and charged by a Beijing court for Zhao's murder. Li was initially given a life sentence, but this was changed to a seven-year imprisonment.

Amanda Zhao's murder and the subsequent investigation highlighted issues with the co-operation of Canada and China in matters of justice, and issues of jurisdiction within Canadian law enforcement.

== Background ==
Amanda Zhao Wei (simplified Chinese: 赵巍; traditional Chinese: 趙巍; pinyin: Zhào Wēi), born on 28 February 1981 in Shaanxi, the People's Republic of China, was a Chinese national, and at the time of her death a 21-year-old international student studying English at Coquitlam College located in Coquitlam, British Columbia, Canada, near the city of Vancouver.

On October 9, 2002, Zhao was reported missing to the authorities, and just over a week later on October 20, her corpse was discovered contained within a suitcase by hikers near Stave Lake, 65 km (40 mi) east of Vancouver.

== Investigation ==
The two murder suspects in the case, Li Ang (李昂) and Zhang Han (张瀚), were arrested in China in the summer of 2009. The prime suspect Li Ang, who was Zhao's boyfriend at the time of murder, was initially in Canada when Zhao's body was found. Li was a Chinese national and a computer science student at Simon Fraser University, located in the Vancouver area.

Zhang Han, who was Li's cousin, was also implicated in the case. He later confessed that he had helped Li dispose of Zhao's body and helped Li travel back to China after the murder. Zhang's confession led to him being charged as an accessory after the fact in Zhao's murder. However, he was later acquitted by the British Columbia Supreme Court because the confession had been improperly obtained. Zhao, Li, and Zhang shared a basement apartment in Burnaby at the time of murder.

Eleven days before the body was found, Li reported to police that Zhao was missing after she went to buy groceries at the local Safeway store. However, three days after Zhao's body was found, Li returned to China.

Li was initially questioned by the RCMP on the case, but it was not until seven months after the murder that the RCMP issued a warrant for his arrest and he was charged with second-degree murder in absentia by the Canadian government.

In 2004, Li had been taken into custody by the Chinese government, but was later released due to lack of evidence.

Li was arrested by Chinese authorities again in October 2009 and convicted in September 2012, and sentenced to life in prison. In 2014, Li's sentence was changed by the Supreme court of Beijing to 7 years. The original first degree murder charge has been changed to secondary degree murder charge as the Supreme court of Beijing ruled that Zhao was accidentally killed by Li during a pillow play fight. The court decision was controversial as the court ruled without any new evidence. Zhao's mother, Yang Baoying, criticised the verdict as a travesty.

== Aftermath ==
The arrests for Amanda Zhao's murder took many years to complete due to the reluctance of the Canadian government in providing evidence about murder cases to China, as Chinese authorities allow for capital punishment for murder, which is illegal in Canada. On October 13, 2009, Secretary of State for Multiculturalism Jason Kenney said that China's capital punishment policy has been a problem in the case.

In 2023, The New Zealand Herald reported that Li (using the alias Leo Li) had entered New Zealand using a fake identity in June 2019. Li also brought his wife Ruixue Yuan and their two sons. Li and his family initially lived in Invercargill before moving to Auckland where he applied for refugee status, claiming that he had experienced persecution and torture in China for his Jehovah's Witnesses beliefs and pro-Tibetan activism. He also falsely claimed that Zhao was still alive and that he had fled to New Zealand after the Chinese Communist Party had summoned him to a military subdistrict office. Immigration New Zealand rejected his refugee application, citing his murder conviction and contradictory testimony. Li has appealed against Immigration NZ's decision to deny him and his family refugee status. Li's pro-Tibetan activism was disputed by the local Tibetan community in Auckland, who described his behaviour as opportunistic in light of his murder conviction.

== See also ==
- List of solved missing person cases (post-2000)
- Murder of Cecilia Zhang, similar case in Toronto
- Murder of Shao Tong, similar case in U.S.
- Trial of Xiao Zhen, similar case in New Zealand
- Zhang Hongjie, similar case in Australia

== Sources ==
- Ming Pao Chinese News Report.
