= Canadian English Language Proficiency Index Program =

English language assessment tool

The Canadian English Language Proficiency Index Program, or CELPIP (/ˈsɛlpɪp/), is an English language assessment tool which measures listening, reading, writing, and speaking skills. The test is administered by Paragon Testing Enterprises., a former subsidiary of the University of British Columbia (UBC) owned by Prometric Canada since 2021.

The CELPIP test is offered in two versions, CELPIP-General, and CELPIP-General LS.

CELPIP-General is suitable for people who need proof of English-language skills when applying for permanent resident status in Canada under the Federal Skilled Worker Program (FSWP), Federal Skilled Trades Program (FSTP), Canadian Experience Class (CEC), Start-up Visa Program, and various Provincial Nominee Programs, or for employment. Immigration, Refugees and Citizenship Canada (IRCC) has two approved English language tests: CELPIP-General, and the International English Language Testing System (IELTS) General Training test.

CELPIP-General LS is suitable for people who need proof of listening and speaking proficiency for Canadian citizenship.

== History ==
CELPIP was developed at the University of British Columbia (UBC) and has existed since at least 2002.

In June 2015, with the acquisition of the Canadian Academic English Language (CAEL) Assessment, Paragon Testing Enterprises retired the CELPIP-Academic Test.

== Test types ==
CELPIP-General logo

=== CELPIP-General ===
The CELPIP-General Test assesses a general level of English-language proficiency. The CELPIP-General Test is accepted as proof of English language proficiency for those applying for Canadian Permanent Residency and to the Association of Saskatchewan REALTORS (ASR).

=== CELPIP-General LS ===
CELPIP-General LS logo

The CELPIP-General LS Test assesses a general level of English-language proficiency. The CELPIP-General LS Test is accepted by Immigration, Refugees and Citizenship Canada (IRCC) as a measure of listening and speaking proficiency for those applying for Canadian citizenship.

In June 2015, Immigration, Refugees and Citizenship Canada (IRCC) implemented changes to the Citizenship Act. Applicants between the ages of 14 and 64 must now meet basic language requirements in listening and speaking in English or French. For minors who are between the ages of 14 and 17, registrations for the CELPIP-General LS Test are accepted.

== Test format ==
=== CELPIP-General ===
The test is completely computer-delivered, and consists of four sections: listening, reading, and writing and speaking. The Listening component is composed of eight parts, but only seven parts will be given during the test. The test taker will not be informed which part is to be omitted.The unscored items in the Reading and Listening section are used for test development. These unscored items can be found anywhere within the component and the test taker will not know which items will be unscored. The total length of all four sections is 180 minutes.

Test Component	Time Allotted	Number of Questions	Component Sections
Listening	47 minutes	2	Practice Test
Listening	47 minutes	8	Part 1: Listening to Problem Solving
Listening	47 minutes	5	Part 2: Listening to a Daily Life Conversation
Listening	47 minutes	6	Part 3: Listening for Information
Listening	47 minutes	5	Part 4: Listening to a News Item
Listening	47 minutes	8	Part 5: Listening to a Discussion
Listening	47 minutes	6	Part 6: Listening to Viewpoints
Listening	47 minutes	5–8	Part 7: Unscored Items
Reading	60 minutes	11	Part 1: Reading Correspondence
Reading	60 minutes	8	Part 2: Reading to Apply a Diagram
Reading	60 minutes	9	Part 3: Reading for Information
Reading	60 minutes	10	Part 4: Reading for Viewpoints
Reading	60 minutes	8–11	Part 7: Unscored Items
Writing	53 minutes	1	Task 1: Writing an Email
Writing	53 minutes	1	Task 2: Responding to Survey Questions
Speaking	20 minutes	1	Practice Task
Speaking	20 minutes	1	Task 1: Giving Advice
Speaking	20 minutes	1	Task 2: Talking about a Personal Experience
Speaking	20 minutes	1	Task 3: Describing a Scene
Speaking	20 minutes	1	Task 4: Making Predictions
Speaking	20 minutes	1	Task 5: Comparing and Persuading
Speaking	20 minutes	1	Task 6: Dealing with a Difficult Situation
Speaking	20 minutes	1	Task 7: Expressing Opinions
Speaking	20 minutes	1	Task 8: Describing an Unusual Situation

=== CELPIP-General LS ===
The test is computer-based, and made up of two sections: listening and speaking. The Listening component is composed of eight Listening parts, but only seven parts will be given during the test. The test taker will not be informed which part is to be omitted.

The total length of all two sections is 67 minutes.

Test Component	Time Allotted	Number of Questions	Component Sections
Listening	47 minutes	2	Part 1: Identifying Similar Meanings
Listening	47 minutes	8	Part 2: Answering Questions
Listening	47 minutes	5	Part 3: Listening to Problem Solving
Listening	47 minutes	6	Part 4: Listening to a Daily Life Conversation
Listening	47 minutes	5	Part 5: Listening for Information
Listening	47 minutes	8	Part 6: Listening to a News Item
Listening	47 minutes	6	Part 7: Listening to a Discussion
Listening	47 minutes	5–8	Part 8: Listening to Viewpoints
Speaking	20 minutes	1	Task 0: Practice Task
Speaking	20 minutes	1	Task 1: Giving Advice
Speaking	20 minutes	1	Task 2: Talking about a Personal Experience
Speaking	20 minutes	1	Task 3: Describing a Scene
Speaking	20 minutes	1	Task 4: Making Predictions
Speaking	20 minutes	1	Task 5: Comparing and Persuading
Speaking	20 minutes	1	Task 6: Dealing with a Difficult Situation
Speaking	20 minutes	1	Task 7: Expressing Opinions
Speaking	20 minutes	1	Task 8: Describing an Unusual Situation

== Scoring ==
Scores are released 8 business days online after the test taker's test date. Two hard copies of the Official CELPIP Score Report are then sent out with Canada Post Regular Mail.

Express Rating scores are released in the test taker's CELPIP account 3 business days after their test date. Express Rating is available, with an extra fee, for the CELPIP-General Test and the CELPIP-General LS Test. Hardcopies of the CELPIP Official Score Report are sent through Canada Post Express Post.

The format and scoring of the CELPIP-General Test and the CELPIP-General LS Test are referenced to the Canadian Language Benchmarks (CLB). Below are the proficiency score levels and their CLB equivalents:

CELPIP Level	CELPIP Descriptor	CLB Level
12	Advanced proficiency in workplace and community contexts	12
11	Advanced proficiency in workplace and community contexts	11
10	Highly effective proficiency in workplace and community contexts	10
9	Effective proficiency in workplace and community contexts	9
8	Good proficiency in workplace and community contexts	8
7	Adequate proficiency in workplace and community contexts	7
6	Developing proficiency in workplace and community contexts	6
5	Acquiring proficiency in workplace and community contexts	5
4	Adequate proficiency for daily life activities	4
3	Some proficiency in limited contexts	3
M	Minimal proficiency or insufficient information to assess	0, 1, 2

Unlike on the IELTS, there are no half-band scores allotted. Band scores are only reported in increments of 1.

== Testing locations ==
The CELPIP Test is available at over 140 locations across Canada and internationally.

== Retaking the CELPIP test ==
Test-takers may attempt the CELPIP exam multiple times without restriction. However, Paragon, the test administrator, enforces these policies:

- Candidates may register for only one test session within any 5-calendar-day period
- Registrations made prematurely may be canceled by Paragon
- Re-registration is prohibited until official test scores are released, allowing candidates to assess their performance before deciding to retake

Each attempt requires payment of the full test fee. Experts recommend thorough preparation before reattempting to maximize results and minimize costs.

== Exam preparation resources ==
One can prepare for the exam by taking free sample tests available through CELPIP's online portal. Alternatively, Paragon provides an opportunity to take a sample test in a real testing centre environment to all prospective test-takers. Among other resources, Paragon produces a wide selection of study materials for each module of the test and also conducts CELPIP Speaking Pro sessions online.

Paragon also maintains a network of trustworthy CELPIP preparation providers https://www.celpip.ca/prepare-for-celpip/prep-programs/.

== See also ==
- CAEL (Canadian Academic English Language Assessment)
- IELTS (International English Language Testing System)
- IRCC (Immigration, Refugees and Citizenship Canada)
- TOEFL (Test of English as a Foreign Language)
- TOEIC (Test of English for International Communication)
