= ITEP =

ITEP is an abbreviation that may mean:

- Improved Turbine Engine Program, a U.S. Army program to develop a new higher output engine for Army helicopters.
- International Test of English Proficiency
- Institute for Theoretical and Experimental Physics
- Institute on Taxation and Economic Policy, a non-profit, non-partisan think tank that works on state and federal tax policy issues.
