= RCIC =

RCIC may refer to:

- Royal Canadian Infantry Corps
- Regulated Canadian Immigration Consultant, see Immigration Consultants of Canada Regulatory Council (ICCRC)
- Rite of Christian Initiation of Children, a process to initiate children into the Catholic faith
- Reactor core isolation cooling system, a security system inside boiling water nuclear reactors
