= Murder of Zhang Hong Jie =

2004 murder in Canberra, Australia

Zhang Hong Jie
- Born: 1979; Shanghai
- Died: 2004 (aged 24); Belconnen, Australia
- Cause of death: Strangulation
- Body discovered: January 2005
- Other names: Steffi Zhang

Zhang Hong Jie (1979–2004), also known as Steffi Zhang, was a 24-year-old international student studying communications at the University of Canberra in Australia when she was murdered in June 2004 by her ex-boyfriend Zhang Long, who fled to China. Six months later, her body was found in her flat in Belconnen in January 2005.

After an impasse between the Australian Government, the Australian Capital Territory, and Chinese officials over the lack of an extradition treaty and the possibility of Long being executed upon conviction in China, an agreement was reached in 2007 to not impose the death penalty. In 2009, Long was sentenced to life in prison after being convicted.

The circumstances of her death and length of time before her body was discovered made national headlines, sparking debate over the duty of care Australian universities provide to foreign students.

== Background ==
Zhang Hong Jie, or Steffi Zhang, was a 24-year-old international student at the University of Canberra in Australia at the time of her death in June 2004. Born in Shanghai, she came to Australia in February 2000, initially studying at the Canberra Institute of Technology before transferring in 2003. Her ex-boyfriend and eventual murderer, Zhang Long, was a former student at the Canberra Institute of Technology and was 25 years old in 2005. They both arrived in Australia at the same time and had met during English classes.

== Murder and discovery ==
Following an argument between the couple on 10 June 2004, Steffi was strangled by her ex-boyfriend Zhang Long, using a computer cable wrapped twice around her neck and tied at the front. According to a statement given to Chinese police, Long said that the argument was over his insistence that she move to Sydney with him.

Long rolled her body in rugs, which he doused with insecticide and perfume, before returning home to Dalian in China. In Dalian, Long checked into hotels during the Australian academic term so his parents would believe he was still away studying. He posed as Steffi online sending emails to her friends and family to avoid suspicion that she was missing. The body was not discovered until 12 January 2005, after neighbours alerted police to a smell coming from Zhang's flat.

== Investigation and arrest ==
Identification of the decomposed remains took six weeks, with ACT Police working with counterparts in China to locate family members and match DNA samples. On 27 February 2005 a warrant was issued in the ACT Magistrates court for Long's arrest.

With the encouragement of his father, Long surrendered to authorities in China in March, confessed to killing Steffi, but insisted that it was accidental. He claimed that during an argument on 9 June 2004, Steffi had struck him on the head with a hammer. In retaliation, he struck her twice with the same hammer and then they grabbed at each other's throats, until she stopped moving. He then claimed he wrapped a computer cable around her neck to drag her body onto a mattress and covered her with a quilt. The coroner would later find that Steffi died of strangulation caused by the cable and concluded that it was the result of a domestic brawl. Australian police refuted conspiracy theories that Long was a Chinese agent and that Steffi was a member of Falun Gong.

== Australia-China dispute, cooperation, and conviction ==
In April 2005, Chief Minister of the Australian Capital Territory Jon Stanhope sought Long's extradition to face charges over the murder. The federal government declined to make a formal request to China in the absence of any standing arrangements between the two countries for extradition.

As of November 2005, Long remained in custody in China but had still not been charged with her murder. Under Chinese law, if the alleged victim and criminal are both Chinese citizens, an overseas crime can be tried in China. However the ACT Government led by Jon Stanhope expressed reluctance to co-operate with Chinese authorities without a guarantee that any conviction relying on evidence provided by ACT police would not result in the death penalty. Australian laws around mutual assistance with foreign criminal investigations forbid police cooperation in cases where a death penalty is possible without a formal assurance that it will not be used.

The Federal Government of Australia pressured the Australian Capital Territory to cooperate with the Chinese investigation into the murder, as written by a letter from John Howard to Chief Minister Stanhope in May 2005, and another request from Justice Minister Chris Ellison in June. The ACT government did not want to because it may mean Long would face a firing squad in China if convicted. The ACT Liberal opposition wanted the Chief Minister to use his Chinese contacts to bring Long to 'justice'. However, ultimately both the Commonwealth and ACT governments agreed not to cooperate unless Long would not face the death penalty.

In May 2007, Chinese authorities confirmed to Australian officials that Long would not face the death penalty if convicted. Subsequently, Australian Federal Police passed on details of the investigation to Chinese police. Long was convicted and sentenced in 2009 to life in prison.

== Aftermath ==
After the murder, the University of Canberra faced criticism for the long time that Steffi, one of its students, had been missing without being flagged. The oversight was the result of a glitch in a new centralised Higher Education Information Management System installed the semester after Steffi's death. The new system was meant to automatically notify Australian immigration officials when foreign students did not enroll in classes, but a computer error left Steffi's absences unrecorded. Immigration officials reprimanded the university and ordered it to verify class attendance for a semester. After the computer error was discovered, the university warned of possible legal action over claims that it was not doing enough for its international students.

Peter Quiddington, a professor of higher education, described the overall failure by the University of Canberra to notice the death as a symptom of issues with Australian higher education "triumph[ing] over basic human civility."

== See also ==
- Amanda Zhao, similar case in Canada
- List of solved missing person cases (2000s)
- Murder of Shao Tong, similar case in U.S.
- Trial of Xiao Zhen, similar case in New Zealand
