= Hotcourses Group =

Educational guidance company

IDP Hotcourses
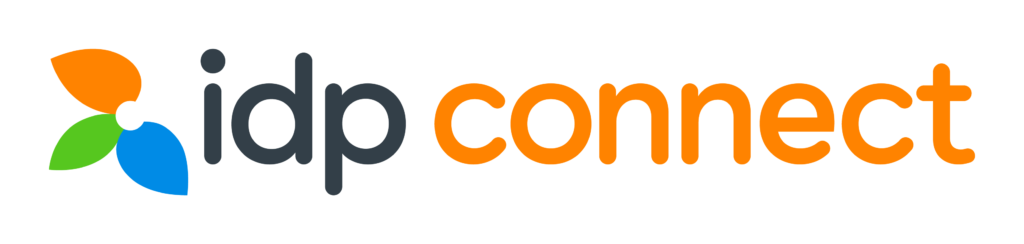
- Trade name: IDP Hotcourses
- Formerly: Hotcourses Limited
- Type: subsidiary
- Industry: Education
- Founded: 1996
- Founders: Jeremy Hunt and Mike Elms
- Headquarters: London, SW6; United Kingdom
- Parent: IDP Education
- Website: www.hotcoursesabroad.com

The Hotcourses Group was the public name for Hotcourses Ltd, an educational guidance company based in Fulham.

In January 2017, Hotcourses Group was bought by IDP Education. and was rebranded as IDP Hotcourses in January 2019.

== History ==
Hotcourses Ltd was founded in 1996 by Jeremy Hunt and Mike Elms. Initially, the company focused on listing courses in the United Kingdom, providing information on further and higher education options. Over time, it expanded its reach internationally, offering services in multiple countries, including the United States, Australia, and Asia.

In 2013 changes to Hotcourses' articles of association were filed at Companies House three years late.

In January 2017, IDP Education, an Australian international education organisation, acquired Hotcourses Group for £30 million. Following the acquisition, the Hotcourses Group was renamed as IDP Hotcourses.

As part of its activities, Hotcourses Group also supported The Hotcourses Foundation, established in 2004, which collaborated with Nyumbani UK to provide educational resources for children in Kenya.

== IDP Hotcourses ==
IDP Hotcourses is an online higher education information platform, focused on international students. Part of IDP Education, it provides course details from universities around the world, and advice on studying abroad. Its flagship study abroad research website, Hotcourses Abroad, launched in 2008.

In 2017, the Hotcourses Group was sold to IDP Education. The company changed its name to IDP Connect in 2019, before coming under the IDP Education brand in 2024.

=== Services ===
IDP Hotcourses offers course information from education institutions internationally. Most of these are universities and colleges in the UK, USA, Canada, Australia, New Zealand and Ireland. Students can contact institutions through the platform for more details, with a view to applying for a course.

In addition, IDP Hotcourses features details of scholarships offered by institutions, and articles with advice and information on various aspects of studying abroad.

== See also ==
- International education
- Study abroad
