= International English Language Testing System =

Test for learners of English as a second language

- Acronym: IELTS
- Type: Standardised test (either computer-delivered or paper-based). Available in 2 modules: "Academic" and "General Training". The IELTS test partners also offer IELTS Life Skills, a speaking and listening test used for UK Visas and Immigration.
- Administrator: British Council, IDP Education, and Cambridge Assessment English.
- Skills tested: Listening, reading, writing, and speaking of English language.
- Purpose: To assess the English language proficiency of non-native English speakers.
- Year started: 1980; 46 years ago (as ELTS); 1989; 37 years ago (as IELTS)
- Duration: Listening: 40 minutes (including 10-minute transfer time in paper-based test), Reading: 60 minutes, Writing: 60 minutes, Speaking: 10-15 minutes. Total: 2 hours 45 minutes
- Score range: 0 to 9, in 0.5 band increments
- Score validity: 2 years
- Offered: Up to 4 times a month. Up to 48 times a year.
- Regions: More than 4,000 test centres in over 140 countries
- Annual number of test takers: ▲ Over 3.5 million in 2018
- Prerequisites: No official prerequisite. Intended for non-native English speakers.
- Fee: Around 250 USD (Note: Depends on region and test centre; a full list is available here.)
- Used by: More than 12,000 colleges, agencies and other institutions in over 140 countries
- Website: ielts.org

The International English Language Testing System (IELTS /ˈaɪ.ɛlts/) is an international standardised test of English language proficiency for non-native English language speakers. One of the major English-language tests in the world, it is jointly managed by the British Council, IDP and Cambridge English, and was established in 1980. The IELTS test has two modules: Academic and General Training. IELTS One Skill Retake was introduced for computer-delivered tests in 2023, which allows a test taker to retake any one section (Listening, Reading, Writing, and Speaking) of the test.

IELTS is accepted by most Australian, British, Canadian, European, and New Zealand academic institutions, by over 3,000 academic institutions in the United States, and by various professional organisations across the world. It is also approved by UK Visas and Immigration (UKVI) as a Secure English Language Test for visa applicants only inside the UK. It also meets requirements for immigration to Australia, where Test of English as a Foreign Language (TOEFL) and Pearson Test of English Academic are also accepted, and New Zealand. In Canada, IELTS, TEF, or CELPIP are accepted by the immigration authority.

No minimum score is required to pass the test. An IELTS result or Test Report Form is issued to all test takers with a score from "Band 1" ("non-user") to "Band 9" ("expert user"), and each institution sets a different threshold. There is also a "Band 0" score for those who did not attempt the test. Institutions are advised not to consider a report older than two years to be valid, unless the user proves that they have worked to maintain their level.

In 2017, over 3 million tests were taken in more than 140 countries, up from 2 million tests in 2012, 1.7 million tests in 2011, and 1.4 million tests in 2009. In 2007, IELTS administered more than one million tests in a single 12-month period for the first time, making it the world's most popular English language test for higher education and immigration.

In 2019, over 508,000 international students went to study in the UK, making it the world's most popular UK ELT (English Language Test) destination. Over half (54%) of those students were under 18 years old.

== History ==
In 1980, the English Language Testing Service (ELTS), the predecessor of IELTS, was launched jointly by Cambridge English Language Assessment (then known as "CLES") and the British Council. It had an innovative format, which reflected changes in language learning and teaching, including the growth in 'communicative' language learning and 'English for specific purposes'. Test tasks were intended to reflect the use of the English language in the 'real world'.

During the 1980s, test-taker numbers were low (4,000 in 1981 rising to 10,000 in 1985) and there were practical difficulties administering the test. As a result, the IELTS Revision Project was set up to oversee the redesign of the test. To have international participation in the redesign, the International Development Program of Australian Universities and Colleges (IDP), now known as IDP: IELTS Australia, joined Cambridge English Language Assessment and the British Council to form the international IELTS partnership which delivers the test to this day. This international partnership was reflected in the new name for the test: The International English Language Testing System (IELTS).

IELTS went live in 1989. Test takers took two non-specialised modules, Listening and Speaking, and two specialised modules, Reading and Writing. Test-taker numbers rose by approximately 15% per year, and by 1995 there were 43,000 test takers in 210 test centres around the world. IELTS was revised again in 1995, with three main changes:

- There was one Academic Reading Module and one Academic Writing Module (previously there had been a choice of three field-specific Reading and Writing modules)
- The thematic link between the Reading and Writing tasks was removed to avoid confusing the assessment of reading and writing ability
- The General Training Reading and Writing modules were brought into line with the Academic Reading and Writing modules (same timing, length of responses, reporting of scores).

Further revisions went live in 2001 (revised Speaking Test) and 2005 (new assessment criteria for the Writing test).

== IELTS characteristics ==
IELTS Academic and IELTS General Training are designed to cover the full range of abilities from non-user or middle user to expert user. The Academic version is for test takers who want to study at the tertiary level in an English-speaking country or seek professional registration. The General Training version is for test takers who want to work, train, study at a secondary school, or migrate to an English-speaking country.

The difference between the Academic and General Training versions is the content, context, and purpose of the tasks. All other features, such as timing allocation, length of written responses, and reporting of scores, are the same. IELTS Academic and General Training both incorporate the following features:

- IELTS tests the ability to listen, read, write and speak in English.
- The speaking module is a key component of IELTS. It is conducted in the form of a one-to-one interview with an examiner, which can occur face-to-face or even through a video conference. The examiner assesses the test taker as they are speaking. The speaking session is also recorded for monitoring and for re-marking in case of an appeal against the score given.
- A variety of accents and writing styles have been presented in test materials to minimise linguistic bias. The accents in the listening section are generally 80% British, Australian, New Zealander and 20% others (mostly American).
- IELTS is developed by experts at Cambridge English Language Assessment with input from item writers from around the world. Teams are located in the UK, US, Canada, Australia, New Zealand, and other English-speaking nations.
- Band scores are used for each language sub-skill (Listening, Reading, Writing, and Speaking). They are averaged out to derive the overall band score for each test-taker.

== IELTS test structure ==
=== Modules ===
There are two modules of the IELTS:

- Academic Module
- General Training Module

There is also a separate test offered by the IELTS test partners, called IELTS Life Skills:

- IELTS Academic is intended for those who want to enrol in universities and other institutions of higher education and for professionals such as medical doctors, engineers, and nurses who want to study or practice in an English-speaking country. Mainly for those who are trying for a non-immigrant student visa.
- IELTS General Training is intended for those planning to undertake non-academic training or to gain work experience, or for immigration purposes.
- IELTS Life Skills is intended for those who need to prove their English speaking and listening skills at Common European Framework of Reference for Languages (CEFR) levels A1 or B1 and can be used to apply for a 'family of a settled person' visa, indefinite leave to remain or citizenship in the UK.

=== The four parts of the IELTS test ===
Part	Duration	Notes
Listening	30 minutes	including 10 minutes transfer time
Reading	60 minutes	
Writing	60 minutes	
Speaking	10–15 minutes	divided into Part 1, Part 2 (CUE Card), and Part 3.
Total Test Time	2 hours and 45 minutes	

Note 1: Listening, Reading and Writing are completed in one sitting. The Speaking test may be taken on the same day or up to seven days before or after the other tests.

Note 2: All test takers take the same Listening and Speaking tests, while the Reading and Writing tests differ depending on whether the test taker is taking the Academic or General Training versions of the test.

Note 3: The 10 minutes transfer time is for the paper-based option of the test. For the computer-delivered option, candidates will be given 2 minutes (at the end of the test) to re-check their answers.

==== Listening ====
The module comprises four sections, with ten questions in each section. It takes around 40 (paper-based) or 32 (computer-delivered) minutes: 30 for testing, plus 10 for transferring the answers to an answer sheet (paper-based) or 2 for re-checking the answers (computer-delivered).

Sections 1 and 2 are about everyday, social situations.

- Section 1 has a conversation between two speakers (for example, a conversation about travel arrangements)
- Section 2 has one person speaking (for example, a speech about local facilities).

Sections 3 and 4 are about educational and training situations

- Section 3 is a conversation between two main speakers (for example, a discussion between two university students, perhaps guided by a tutor)
- Section 4 has one person speaking about an academic subject.

Each section begins with a short introduction telling the test taker about the situation and the speakers. Then they have some time to look through the questions. The questions are in the same order as the information in the recording, so the answer to the first question will be before the answer to the second question, and so on. The first three sections have a break in the middle allowing test takers to look at the remaining questions. Each section is heard only once.

At the end of the test, candidates are given 10 minutes to transfer their answers to an answer sheet (if they take their test paper-based) or 2 minutes (at the end of the test of course) to re-check the answers (if they do so computer-delivered). Test takers will lose marks for incorrect spelling and grammar.

==== Reading ====
The Reading paper has three sections and texts totalling approximately 2,150–3,250 words. There will be a variety of question types, such as multiple-choice, short-answer questions, identifying information, identifying writers' views, labelling diagrams, completing a summary using words taken from the text, and matching information/headings/features in the text/sentence endings. Test takers should be careful when writing down their answers as they will lose marks for incorrect spelling and grammar.

Texts in IELTS Academic

- Three reading texts, which come from books, journals, magazines, newspapers and online resources written for non-specialist audiences. All the topics are of general interest to students at undergraduate or postgraduate level.

Texts in IELTS General Training

- Section 1 contains two or three short texts or several shorter texts, which deal with everyday topics. For example, timetables or notices – things a person would need to understand when living in an English-speaking country.
- Section 2 contains two texts, which deal with work. For example, job descriptions, contracts, training materials.
- Section 3 contains one long text about a topic of general interest. The text is generally descriptive, longer and more complex than the texts in Sections 1 and 2. The text will be taken from a newspaper, magazine, book or online resource.

==== Writing ====
IELTS Academic

- Task 1: test takers describe a graph, table, chart, map, process, pie chart or diagram in their own words.
- Task 2: test takers discuss a point of view, argument, or problem. Depending on the task, test takers may be required to present a solution to a problem, present and justify an opinion, compare and contrast evidence, opinions and implications, and evaluate and challenge ideas, evidence or an argument.

IELTS General Training

- Task 1: test takers write a letter in response to a given everyday situation. For example, writing to an accommodation officer about problems with your accommodation, writing to a new employer about problems managing your time, or writing to a local newspaper about a plan to develop a local airport.
- Task 2: test takers write an essay about a topic of general interest. For example, whether smoking should be banned in public places, whether children's leisure activities should be educational, or how environmental problems can be solved.

==== Speaking ====
The speaking test is a face-to-face interview between the test taker and an examiner. It contains three sections.

- Section 1: introduction and interview (4–5 minutes). Test takers may be asked about their home, family, work, studies, hobbies, interests, reasons for taking the IELTS exam, and other general topics such as clothing, free time, computers, and the Internet.
- Section 2: long turn (3–4 minutes). Test takers are given a task card about a particular topic. Test takers have one minute to prepare to talk about this topic. The task card states the points that should be included in the talk and one aspect of the topic which must be explained during the talk. Test takers are then expected to talk about the topic for one to two minutes, after which the examiner may ask one or two questions.
- Section 3: discussions (4–5 minutes). The third section involves a discussion between the examiner and the test taker, generally on questions relating to the theme which they have already spoken about in Section 2. These questions usually consist of two sets of four or five questions.

== Band scale and scoring ==
Test takers receive a score for each test component – Listening, Reading, Writing, and Speaking. The individual scores are then averaged and rounded to produce an Overall Band Score.

There is no pass or fail. IELTS is scored on a nine-band scale, with each band corresponding to a specified competence in English. Overall Band Scores are reported to the nearest half band.

The following rounding convention applies: if the average across the four skills ends in .25, it is rounded up to the next half band, and if it ends in .75, it is rounded up to the next whole band. The nine bands are described as follows:

Band	Competency	Description
9	Expert	The individual has a full operational command of the English language. Their use of English is appropriate, accurate, fluent, and shows complete understanding.
8	Very good	Has fully operational command of the language with only occasional unsystematic inaccuracies. Misunderstandings may occur in unfamiliar situations. Handles complex detailed argumentation well.
7	Good	Has operational command of the language, though with occasional inaccuracies, inappropriateness and misunderstandings in some situations. Generally handles complex language well and understands detailed reasoning.
6	Competent	Has generally effective command of the language despite some inaccuracies or misunderstandings. Can use and understand fairly complex language, particularly in familiar situations.
5	Modest	Has partial command of the language, coping with overall meaning in most situations, though is likely to make many mistakes. Should be able to handle basic communication in own field.
4	Limited	Basic competence is limited to familiar situations. Has frequent problems in understanding and expression. Is not able to use complex language.
3	Extremely limited	Conveys and understands only general meaning in very familiar situations. Frequent breakdowns in communication occur.
2	Intermittent	No real communication is possible except for the most basic information using isolated words or short formulae in familiar situations and to meet immediate needs. Has great difficulty understanding spoken and written English.
1	Non	cannot essentially use the language beyond possibly a few isolated words.
0	Did not attempt	No assessable information provided at all.

=== IELTS Band compared to the CEFR level ===
IELTS Band	CEFR
9.0	C2
8.5	C2
8.0	C1
7.5	C1
7.0	C1
6.5	B2
6.0	B2
5.5	B2
5.0	B1
4.5	B1
4.0	B1
3.5	A2
3.0	A2
2.5	A1
2.0	A1
1.5	A1
1.0	A1
0.5	N/A
0.0	N/A

== Results ==
For a computer-delivered test, results are released between 3 and 5 days. For a paper-based test, a Test Report Form will be sent to test takers 13 days after their test. It shows:

- An Overall Band Score (from 1 to 9)
- A band score (from 1 to 9) for each section of the test (Listening, Reading, Writing, and Speaking)
- The test taker's estimated CEFR level in the English language
- Whether IELTS Academic or General Training was completed
- Test date and the date that the certificate was signed
- Test report form number (15–18 characters as a mixture of numbers and capital letters)
- The test taker's photo, sex (male/female), nationality, candidate ID, first and last name, first language, and date of birth

Test takers receive one copy of their Test Report Form, apart from test takers applying to the Department of Citizenship and Immigration Canada (CIC) or UK Visas and Immigration (UKVI), who receive two copies. Test Report Forms are valid for two years.

== Locations and test dates ==
Test takers can take IELTS in more than 140 countries and in over 4,000 locations. There are up to 48 test dates available per year. Each test centre offers tests up to four times a month depending on local demand. The Academic version is available on all 48 dates per year, and the General Training version is available on 24 dates.

There used to be a minimum time limit of 90 days before a person was allowed to retake the test. However, this restriction has been withdrawn, and currently there is no limit for applicants to retake the test.

== Level required by academic institutions for admission ==
Just over half (51%) of test takers take IELTS to enter higher education in a foreign country. The IELTS minimum scores required by academic institutions and by course vary. As a general rule, the top-ranked universities in the United States tend to require a higher IELTS band (typically 7.0). Most universities accept scores between 6 and 7 as being suitable for undergraduate study in English. Full details about the organisations which accept IELTS and the scores they require can be found on the IELTS Global Recognition System website.

== IELTS use for immigration purposes ==
Several Commonwealth countries use IELTS scores as proof of prospective immigrants' competence in English.

=== Australia ===
Australia's immigration authorities have used IELTS to assess the English proficiency of prospective migrants since May 1998, when this test replaced the 'access:' test that had been previously used.

There are different IELTS score requirements for different types of visa.

Department of Immigration Level of English	Minimum IELTS score (Mar 2019)	Visas
Functional English	4.5 in every subscore	Permanent and provisional skilled visas (to avoid paying the English Language Charge)
Vocational English	5.0 in every subscore	457 visa, ENS and RSMS visas through the Temporary Residence Transitional stream for people who have held a 457 visa for 2 years with the employer
Competent English	6.0 every subscore	ENS and RSMS visas through the Direct Entry Stream, Skilled migration (6.0 is the minimum threshold, but receives 0 points)
Proficient English	7.0 every subscore	Points Tested Skilled visas (to obtain 10 points)
Superior English	8.0 every subscore	Points Tested Skilled visas (to obtain 20 points)

=== New Zealand ===
New Zealand has used the IELTS test since 1995. There are different IELTS score requirements for different types of visa and type of applicant.

Visa category	Minimum IELTS score required if the applicant is not demonstrating the minimum standard in another way (May 2015)
Skilled Migrant	Principal applicant: 6.5. Partners and children aged 16 and over: 5.0
Business categories (Investor, Entrepreneur, Long Term Business Visa, Employees of Relocating Business)	Principal applicants: 5.0. Partners and children aged 16 and over: In some cases, partners and children are not required to meet the minimum level of English at the time the application is lodged, but can provide evidence at a later stage.

Originally, applicants who could not achieve the required score could pay a NZ$20,000 fee instead, which would be fully or partially refunded later if the migrant were able to successfully take the test within a certain period (3 to 12 months) after his or her arrival in the country. A few years later, the policy was changed: the fee was reduced, and, instead of being potentially refundable, it became treated as a "pre-purchase" of post-arrival ESL tuition.

=== Canada ===
Citizenship and Immigration Canada (CIC) uses IELTS and/or TEF as evidence of one's ability to communicate in English and/or French. The CELPIP (Canadian English Language Proficiency Index Program) test scores are an alternative to IELTS.

The Canadian Language Benchmarks (CLB) are the national standards used in Canada for describing, measuring, and recognising the English language proficiency of prospective immigrants. The following table shows the IELTS scores needed for each CLB level.

Canadian Language Benchmark (CLB)	Reading	Writing	Listening	Speaking
10	8.0	7.5	8.5	7.5
9	7.0	7.0	8.0	7.0
8	6.5	6.5	7.5	6.5
7	6.0	6.0	6.0	6.0
6	5.0	5.5	5.5	5.5
5	4.0	5.0	5.0	5.0
4	3.5	4.0	4.5	4.0

There are different language requirements for different types of immigration programmes as shown below:

Visa category	Minimum Canadian Language Benchmark (CLB) required (May 2015)
The Federal Skilled Worker Program	CLB 7
The Federal Skilled Trades Program	CLB 5 for speaking and listening, CLB 4 for reading and writing
The Canadian Experience Class	CLB 7 for NOC 0 or A jobs, CLB 5 for NOC B jobs
Business start-up visa	CLB 5
Provincial Nominee Programs	CLB 4 for NOC C and D jobs

Submitting one's IELTS scores is also one of the several ways to prove one's proficiency in an official language when applying for Canadian citizenship (minimum of CLB level 4 required).

=== United Kingdom ===
On 6 April 2015, UK Visas and Immigration (UKVI) changed its English language requirements for UK visa and immigration (UKVI) applications. IELTS assesses all four language skills and is accepted by UK Visas and Immigration at levels B1 to C2 of the Common European Framework of Reference for Languages (CEFR).

A new test, IELTS Life Skills, assesses Speaking and Listening at CEFR level B1 and at CEFR level C1. IELTS Life Skills can be used to meet the English language requirements for some classes of visa application, including 'family of a settled person' visas and indefinite leave and citizenship. It is also used for visa and immigration purposes; IELTS and IELTS Life Skills must be taken in test centres approved by the UKVI.

Visa	Minimum CEFR level required (May 2015)	Minimum IELTS score required overall and in each skill (May 2015)
Tier 1 (General) visa	C1	7.0 overall, and in each of the four skills
Tier 1 (Exceptional Talent) visa	B1	4.0 overall, and in each of the four skills
Tier 1 (Entrepreneur) visa	B1	4.0 overall, and in each of the four skills
Tier 1 (Graduate Entrepreneur) visa	B1	4.0 overall, and in each of the four skills
Tier 2 (General) visa	B1	4.0 overall, and in each of the four skills
Tier 2 (Sportsperson) visa	B1	4.0 overall, and in each of the four skills
Tier 2 (Minister of Religion) visa	B2	5.5 overall, and in each of the four skills
Tier 4 (General) student visa - below degree level	B1	4.0 overall, and in each of the four skills
Tier 4 (General) student visa - degree level and above and including some pre-sessional courses	B2	5.5 overall, and in each of the four skills
'Family of a settled person' visa	B1	IELTS Life Skills at B1 – Pass, IELTS – 4.0 in Speaking and Listening
Indefinite leave to remain (to settle) or citizenship	B1	IELTS Life Skills at B1 – Pass, IELTS – 4.0 in Speaking and Listening

For UK visa purposes, the test is designed to meet certain administrative requirements specified by UKVI. These Test Report Forms are slightly different to show that the test taker has taken the test at an IELTS UKVI session. The actual test taken is the same – same content, examiners, format, level of difficulty, scoring and so on.

== Criticism ==
One criticism revolves around the accessibility and affordability of the IELTS test. The cost of taking the test, which varies by region but is generally considered expensive, can be a major barrier for test-takers from developing countries. For many, the test is prohibitively expensive, particularly if they need to retake it multiple times to achieve their desired score.

In addition to cost, accessibility issues arise from the limited availability of IELTS test centres. These centres are concentrated in urban areas, making it difficult for candidates in rural or remote locations to access testing facilities. This uneven distribution of test centres disproportionately affects individuals from less economically developed regions.

== Other English proficiency tests ==
- ACTFL Assessment of Progress toward Proficiency in Languages
- Cambridge English Language Assessment
- CAE, Cambridge English: Advanced
- Cambridge English: First
- CPE, Cambridge English: Proficiency
- CAEL, Canadian Academic English Language Assessment
- CELPIP, Canadian English Language Proficiency Index Program
- CU-TEP, Chulalongkorn University Test of English Proficiency
- EF Standard English Test, an open-access standardised English test
- Duolingo English Test
- ITEP, International Test of English Proficiency.
- MUET, Malaysian University English Test
- OET, English language testing for Healthcare professionals
- OPI, OPIc
- Oxford Test of English
- PTE Academic, The Pearson Test of English
- STEP, Saudi Standardized Test for English Proficiency
- STEP Eiken, Test of English
- TELC, The European Language Certificates
- TOEFL, Test of English as a Foreign Language
- TOEIC, Test of English for International Communication
- TrackTest, English Proficiency Test Online (CEFR-based)
- Trinity College London ESOL
- TSE, Test of Spoken English
- UBELT, University of Bath English Language Test

== See also ==
- English as a Foreign or Second Language (EFSL)
- International Student Admissions Test (ISAT)
- National Accreditation Authority for Translators and Interpreters (NAATI)
- Teaching English as a foreign language (TEFL)
- List of admissions tests
