= Bellissimo Law Group PC =

Canadian immigration law firm

- Industry: Law
- Founded: Toronto, Ontario
- Founder: Mario D. Bellissimo
- Website: bellissimolawgroup.com

Bellissimo Law Group PC is a Canadian law firm based in Toronto, Ontario. The firm specializes in citizenship, immigration, and refugee protection law. Its founder is Mario D. Bellissimo, an immigration lawyer and an author of multiple legal publications.

== History ==
Mario D. Bellissimo is the founder of Bellissimo Law Group Professional Corporation, setting up its head office in Toronto. He graduated from Osgoode Hall Law School and became a Certified Specialist in Citizenship and Immigration Law and Refugee Protection. His experience includes serving as the past Chair of the Canadian Bar Association National Immigration Law Section and an appointed member of the Federal Court Rules Committee.

Bellissimo Law Group PC specializes in Canadian citizenship, immigration and refugee law. It deals with individual and corporate litigation, immigration inadmissibility, and protected persons cases. It also handles applications for permanent residency and temporary residency in Canada. The firm has appeared before all immigration tribunals and courts, including the Supreme Court of Canada. In 2005, it provided co-counsel for the Hilewitz v Canada and De Jong v Canada case. In 2017, Bellissimo Law Group PC worked on Hassouna v Canada. The firm represented one of the applicants, successfully reversing an unconstitutional citizenship revocation law. Former Justice Jocelyne Gagné ruled that Canadian citizenship is a right and not a privilege.

Bellissimo Law Group PC has testified before the Parliament of Canada committees and Senate of Canada committees, contributing to the proposed amendments to citizenship, immigration, and protected persons laws. Bellissimo, a legal expert on medical inadmissibility, spoke about the subject before the Canadian House of Commons Standing Committee on Citizenship and Immigration (CIMM) in 2017. Additionally, Bellissimo Law Group PC submitted recommendations to the CIMM in 2022. The brief proposed technological reforms to the use of artificial intelligence to Immigration, Refugees and Citizenship Canada (IRCC).

In 2023, Bellissimo Law Group PC submitted a brief to C-27 regarding the Consumer Privacy Protection Act (CPPA), the Personal Information and Data Protection Tribunal Act (PIDPTA), and the Artificial Intelligence and Data Act (AIDA). Its recommendations include the need for a universal Canadian Charter of Digital Rights and Freedoms and legislative right to data security and transparency in the use of AI. It also recommended legislative protections of AI under user control, AI legal training requirements, and legislated external audits. In the same year, Bellissimo testified before the CIMM regarding his analysis of Bill S-8, which involves applying sanctions on foreign nationals.

Bellissimo Law Group PC is involved in providing legal analysis and policy papers to the Canadian government. Bellissimo has proposed recommendations on behalf of immigration advocacy associations and an individual capacity. Bellissimo Law Group PC has served on multiple committees involving the Federal Court of Canada, the Immigration and Refugee Board of Canada (IRB), Immigration, Refugees and Citizenship Canada (IRCC), the Canada Border Services Agency (CBSA), Employment and Social Development Canada (ESDC), and the Department of Justice Canada.

Over the years, Bellissimo Law Group PC has been interviewed by numerous media sources as an authority on immigration law. Its print interviews include the National Post, The Globe and Mail, Toronto Star, and others. Likewise, its television and radio interviews include CBC News, CTV News, OMNI News, and other outlets. The firm has spoken extensively to the media about international students in Canada. In August 2023, Bellissimo appeared in CBC Radio's The Current to analyze the topic and propose changes to the international student system. In addition, Bellissimo has taught immigration law courses and presented at nationwide legal seminars.

=== Pro bono ===
Bellissimo Law Group PC has years of experience handling pro bono cases. It acts pro bono for COSTI Immigration Resettlement Services, serving as the Immigration Law and Policy Advisor. In addition, the firm is one of the pro bono partners for Toronto's Hospital for Sick Children (HSC), providing counsel for numerous families. Its work involves helping ill children and their parents at risk of deportation.

== Publications ==
Bellissimo Law Group PC has released multiple legal publications about different facets of Canadian immigration law. The works include Canadian Immigration Law and Policy: Then and Now, Canadian Citizenship and Immigration Inadmissibility Law and A Practical Guide to Canadian Citizenship and Inadmissibility. In 2019, Bellissimo authored Labour Market Impact Assessments, Compliance and Enforcement: A Practical Guide. He is also an Editor-in-Chief of Immigration Law Reporter, which examines immigration cases and policies.

Bellissimo has also authored Canadian Citizenship and Immigration Inadmissibility: Criminal Law Edition. His other publications include A Practical Guide to Canadian Citizenship and Immigration Inadmissibility Law: Corporate Edition, A Practical Guide to Canadian Citizenship and Immigration Inadmissibility Law: Refugee Law Edition, and A Practical Guide to Canadian Citizenship and Immigration Inadmissibility Law: Immigration Practitioner’s Edition.

== Awards ==
In 2016, Bellissimo Law Group PC received the Canadian National Pro Bono Law Firm Award from Pro Bono Ontario (PBO). In 2023, PBO and Canadian Lawyer recognized Bellissimo Law Group PC as an awardee for the Best Pro Bono Law Firms in Canada. Additionally, Best Lawyers named Bellissimo as Lawyer of the Year for Immigration Law in Toronto, Canada in 2016, 2018, 2021, and 2025 and The Best Lawyers in Canada for Immigration Law in the 2023, 2024, and 2025 editions.
