= Canadian Language Benchmarks =

Canadian language proficiency assessment

The Canadian Language Benchmarks (CLB), or Niveaux de compétence linguistique canadien (NCLC) in French, is a 12-point scale of task-based language proficiency descriptors used to guide the teaching and assessment of learners of English and French languages in Canada. Like the Common European Framework of Reference for Languages and the ACTFL Proficiency Guidelines, the Canadian Language Benchmarks describe learners' successive levels of communicative achievement.

The CLB's 12 benchmarks are divided into 3 stages of proficiency: basic, intermediate and advanced, covering listening, speaking, reading and writing. The theory behind the CLB includes pragmatic knowledge, grammatical knowledge, textual knowledge, functional knowledge, and sociolinguistic knowledge.

Each benchmark is then described in terms of "can do" statements or "performance descriptors". For example, the following are two task descriptors for Benchmark 5 in writing, from the 2012 version:

- Write short business or service correspondence for routine personal needs.
- Write a paragraph to relate a familiar sequence of events, description of a person, object or routine.

== History ==
The CLB grew out of a federal government initiative undertaken in 1992, to support the language learning needs of immigrants to the country. In 1993, Citizenship and Immigration Canada established the National Working Group on Language Benchmarks. In November 1996, the group published the Canadian Language Benchmarks (Working Document). This working group was eventually to become the Board of Directors of the Centre for Canadian Language Benchmarks. The CCLB received its charter as a non-profit agency in March 1998. In 2000, the Canadian Language Benchmarks 2000, by Grazyna Pawlikowska-Smith, was published.

In 2012, a revised version of the CLB was published and an updated theoretical framework. A team of writers and language experts worked on the revision in both English and in French. The CLB/NCLC theory was validated against the Common European Framework for Language, the ACTEFL and the Quebec version of the benchmarks.

A set of benchmarks for literacy learners who have English as a second language was first developed in 1996 and revised in 2000 by the Government of Manitoba. Another revision of the literacy benchmarks was done in fiscal 2013/2014 and was expected to be released once validation was complete in 2014.

The CLB has also been used to identify the level of curricula, courses and requirements for entry into post-secondary training in some parts of Canada. In Manitoba, some Ontario community colleges and in British Columbia, the CLB is part of an articulation agreement.

Since 2002, the CLB has been used as a scale to help define the language demands that are used in some occupations and professions. The first benchmarking projects were done at the provincial level by Red River College in Manitoba. In 2002, CCLB did the first national benchmarking project to identify the language demands of the nursing profession. This was followed by the development of a national test to verify the language competency of internationally trained nurses, the Canadian English Language Benchmarks Assessment for Nurses (CELBAN). Further research was done by the Centre for occupations in the following industries: travel and hospitality, trucking, trades, food and grocery, and professions like pharmacy, physiotherapy and occupational therapy, audiology and speech language pathology. Many of these profiles have been captured in documents called "Occupational Language Analyses" (OLAs), which reflect the communication skills extrapolated from occupational competency documents, the Essential Skills and aligned to the CLB/NCLC. Many of these are available on the website Canadian Language Benchmarks and Essential Skills for the workplace. or by contacting the CCLB. The CLB has also been correlated to the Essential Skills.

== Assessment ==
The CLB has been used since 1996 as the basis for CLB-based assessments. These assessments reflect what a second language speaker can demonstrate in terms of language and communication, typically across the four skills of listening, speaking, reading, and writing. The framework has been applied in both formative and summative contexts and is defined for use in low-stakes as well as higher-stakes situations. Additional discussion of how these assessments are applied in classroom and testing settings can be found in practitioner-oriented resources, including guides and instructional materials.

=== Examples ===
- The Canadian Language Benchmarks Assessment (CLBA)
- The Canadian Language Benchmarks Literacy Assessment (CLBLA)
- The Canadian Language Benchmarks Placement Test (CLBPT)
- Literacy Placement Tool: Volume I
- Literacy Placement Tool: Volume II
- Canadian English Language Benchmarks Assessment for Nurses (CELBAN)
- Milestones (a high-stakes test in development for Citizenship & Immigration Canada)

=== Classroom assessment resources for instructors ===
- Summative Assessment Manual (SAM)
- Exit Tasks for CLB 5 - 10
- Integrating Assessment into the CLB Classroom
- Portfolio-based language assessment (PBLA)
- Can Do Statements

== Immigration language requirements ==
Canada has strict language requirements for immigration. Federal Skilled Workers are expected to have a minimum CLB level 7 score in order to be eligible for immigration. Canada accepts popular English testing reports of IELTS-GT and CELPIP-G and French testing reports of TEF/TCF for immigration purposes. The bands have to be converted to CLB /NCLC equivalent levels using the below conversion chart or by using a CLB Calculator which converts IELTS/CELPIP-G/TEF/TCF scores to their CLB/NCLC equivalents:

=== Federal Skilled Worker Program ===
First official language
Language	Minimum level for all four abilities
English	CLB 7
French	NCLC7

Second official language: Minimum level of CLB or NCLC 5.

=== Canadian Experience Class ===
NOC skill type or level	Minimum level for all four language abilities (English)	Minimum level for all four language abilities (French)
NOC 0 or A	CLB 7	NCLC 7
NOC B	CLB 5	NCLC 5

=== Federal Skilled Trades Program ===
Language	Abilities	Minimum level
English	Speaking and listening	CLB 5
English	Reading and writing	CLB 4
French	Speaking and listening	NCLC 5
French	Reading and writing	NCLC 4

== See also ==
- CELPIP (Canadian English Language Proficiency Index Program)
- IELTS
