= Migration Agents Registration Authority =

Australian Government authority that regulates the Migration Agents profession

Office of the Migration Agents Registration Authority (OMARA)
Agency overview
- Formed: 1 July 2009
- Superseding agency: Migration Agents Registration Authority (MARA)
- Jurisdiction: Commonwealth of Australia
- Employees: 30–40
- Parent agency: Department of Home Affairs
- Website: www.mara.gov.au

The Office of the Migration Agents Registration Authority (OMARA) is an Australian Government authority that registers migration agents and regulates the Migration Agents profession. Migration agents assist people to migrate to Australia by using their knowledge of Australian visas and immigration law to complete necessary visa applications and represent them in dealings with the Department of Home Affairs (previously the Department of Immigration and Citizenship), the tribunals, the minister, federal courts and high courts of Australia.

The Office also assists people to find a migration agent, provide advice about fees that agents might charge and assist with making complaints about agents.

Under Australian law (Migration Act 1958, Part 3) any person who gives "immigration assistance" must usually be a Registered Migration Agent. The term "immigration assistance" is defined in section 276 of the Act to cover using, or purporting to use, knowledge of or experience in migration procedure to advise or assist various people with visa applications and related sponsorships, appeals, etc.

On 9 February 2009, after a review, the Minister for Immigration and Citizenship, Senator Chris Evans, announced new arrangements to govern migration agents. Under these new arrangements, the OMARA was established on 1 July 2009. Previously, the legislation appointed an organisation called the Migration Institute of Australia Limited (MIA) to function as the Migration Agents Registration Authority (MARA), which was charged with maintaining a register of migration agents and carrying out a variety of functions under the Act in relation to supervision and discipline of agents.

The OMARA is a discrete office which is part of the Department of Home Affairs. They are located in Sydney but operate nationally.

== Functions ==
The functions of the OMARA are set out in section 316 of the Migration Act 1958. Key objectives are to ensure that:

- only suitable persons are registered as migration agents, and unsuitable persons are refused registration or re-registration;
- registered agents maintain appropriate knowledge to enable them to provide accurate advice to consumers;
- all complaints about the services of registered, or formerly registered migration agents are appropriately addressed and appropriately dealt with by OMARA;
- the OMARA is a division of the Department of Immigration and Border Protection (The Department). The OMARA is not independent from The Department but is a discrete division of The Department. Both share the same Australian Business Number and are listed as one and then same entity. As such the OMARA disseminates information about migration agents within The Department (to which it belongs)and other bodies such as prosecuting or regulatory authorities to address the activities of agents outside its mandate;
- consumers understand their rights and their obligations and agents understand their obligations and their rights under the regulatory framework.

== Registration requirements ==
Migration agents registered before July 2006 were not required to undertake any formal studies. A multiple-choice exam called the MAPKEE was used as the measure of knowledge of immigration rules and procedures. Afterwards, new applicants must either have a current practising certificate as a lawyer or must undertake a graduate certificate in Australian migration law and practice, which was changed later in 2018 to a graduate diploma with the additional requirement of passing a capstone exam after completion of the graduate diploma.

All registered migration agents are required to complete approved continuing professional development (CPD) each year prior to re-registration. The OMARA also regulates organisations that provide CPD activities to registered migration agents.

In the States of New South Wales, Victoria, Queensland and South Australia, practising lawyers may also apply for accreditation as specialists in Australian immigration law.

== Sanctions ==
The office has the power to place sanctions on agents who they determine do not act either ethically, honestly, legally or in the best interests of their clients. These sanctions can include a caution, registration suspension and cancellation. Registered Agents can appeal sanction decisions which they believe have been made in error by the OMARA.

== Similar bodies in other countries ==
In New Zealand, the Immigration Advisers Authority (IAA) performs a similar function to the OMARA, as does the Office of the Immigration Services Commissioner (OISC) in the United Kingdom and the Immigration Consultants of Canada Regulatory Council (ICCRC) in Canada.

However, in those countries practising lawyers are regulated by their own professional bodies. In the United States, only practicing lawyers may perform such functions.

== See also ==
- Immigration to Australia
- Australian nationality law
