= Trial of Xiao Zhen =

Chinese murder trial of controversial jurisdiction

The trial of Xiao Chen (Chinese: 肖真) in Shanghai, China, for the murder of Hiren Mohini in Mount Eden, New Zealand, is notable as the first time a New Zealand murder has been tried in a foreign court. In the Chinese media, the case was frequently referred to as "New Zealand's first murder case" (新西兰第一命案).

== Crime ==
Hiren Mohini, a taxi driver born in Mumbai, had picked up a fare in central Auckland and gone to Mount Eden between 1:00 am and 2:00 am on 31 January 2010. At Mount Eden, he was fatally stabbed, apparently by a passenger. Police found a knife and soon had a suspect, based partly on CCTV footage. NZ$100,000 was raised from the New Zealand public to support Mohini's family.

The suspect, Xiao Zhen, was a 23-year old Chinese national and kitchen worker at the SkyCity casino complex. Zhen left New Zealand for China on 4 February, apparently to visit a sick grandfather. China does not have an extradition agreement with New Zealand and in any case does not extradite Chinese citizens even when an extradition treaty does exist.

== Trial ==
After reciprocal visits between the New Zealand and Chinese police, Xiao Zhen was arrested in Shanghai in June 2010. The New Zealand authorities obtained formal written assurances that the death penalty would not be invoked. New Zealand has not had the death penalty for murder since 1961, and does not extradite criminal suspects to countries where they could face a death sentence.

All the New Zealand evidence was translated into Chinese by the New Zealand police for the trial at the Second Intermediate People's Court in Shanghai at which the suspect confessed. Xiao Zhen claimed that Mohini had verbally insulted him after he boarded the taxi. Xiao demanded that he stop the taxi and refused to pay the fare. A struggle ensued, and Xiao Zhen stabbed the driver with a kitchen knife. The trial lasted only a few hours, with no in-person evidence presented, but Mandarin translations of witness statements and evidence were handed up to the judges. A verdict and sentence was expected on 17 August 2011.

On 17 August, Xiao Zhen was sentenced to 15 years in prison.

== Aftermath ==
Associate Professor Bill Hodge of the University of Auckland called the trial "an insult to New Zealand jurisdiction".

== See also ==
- Murder of Amanda Zhao, a similar case in Canada
- Murder of Shao Tong, a similar case in the U.S.
- Murder of Zhang Hongjie, a similar case in Australia
