= Real Estate Council of Alberta =

The Real Estate Council of Alberta (RECA) regulates the real estate brokerage, mortgage brokerage, property management, and condo management industries in Alberta, Canada. RECA operates on behalf of the Government of Alberta under the authority of the Real Estate Act.
