= Association of Saskatchewan Realtors =

The Saskatchewan REALTORS® Association (SRA) is the professional association that represents over 1,500 real estate brokers and salespeople in Saskatchewan.

While the SRA officially came into existence in 2020, the story began long before then.

Organized real estate has been around for over a century in Saskatchewan. REALTORS® came together to establish a cohesive voice in real estate and enhance professionalism within the industry. Together, real estate professionals could establish boards and become better equipped to make recommendations to governing agencies.

At its height, Saskatchewan had twelve REALTOR® associations throughout the province: Estevan, Moose Jaw, Swift Current, Yorkton, Weyburn, Lloydminster, Prince Albert, Melfort, Saskatoon, Regina, Battlefords and Saskatchewan. Today, there are two – Saskatchewan and Lloydminster.

Over time, smaller associations joined with Saskatoon and Regina until there were only three local boards. With a small population relative to other regions in the country, Saskatoon, Regina and Saskatchewan associations found efficiencies by working together and collaborating on major projects. After a couple failed attempts to merge the three associations, on March 19, 2019, members voted to form a single provincial association – the Saskatchewan REALTORS® Association.

== History ==
- 1912 - Association of Regina Realtors founded
- 2006 - Saskatchewan Real Estate Association renamed the Association of Saskatchewan Realtors
- 2020 - The Saskatchewan REALTORS® Association is formed following the merger of the Association of Saskatchewan REALTORS®, the Regina REALTORS® Association and the Saskatoon & Region REALTORS® Association.

== See also ==
- Canadian Real Estate Association
- Multiple Listing Service
