= International Test of English Proficiency =

Test for second language English speakers

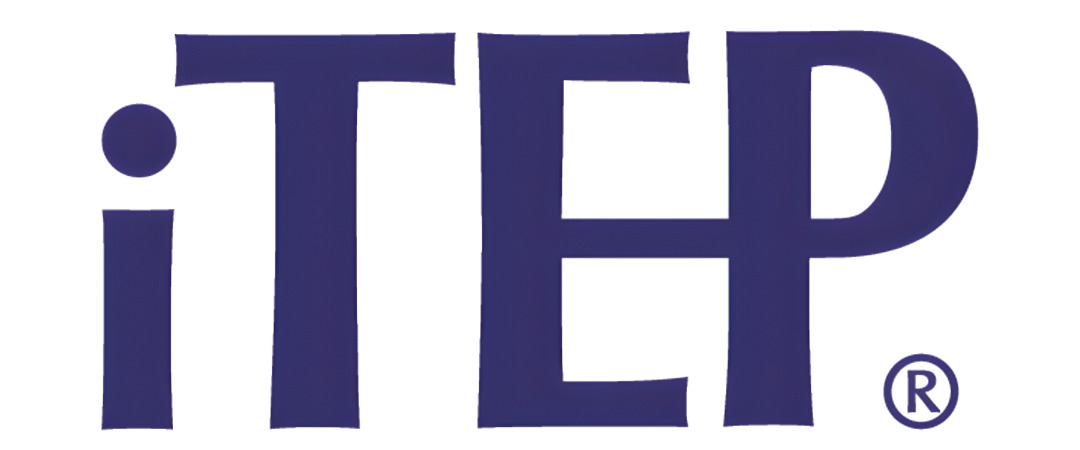
Logo

iTEP International (“iTEP” International Test of English Proficiency) is a leader in online English testing, offering many standardized exams designed to measure the English skills of non-native English speakers. It's assessments are aligned to the Common European Framework of Reference for Languages (CEFR).

Founded in 2002, iTEP provides digital English proficiency testing to students, schools, companies and governments. According to the company, iTEP was the first to offer online high-stakes English proficiency testing.

iTEP serves a diverse range of markets, including international secondary schools, universities and colleges, intensive English programs, teacher certification bodies, and career and workplace testing.

The company distributes its assessments in over 100+ countries through direct sales to international customers and a global system of exclusive and non-exclusive distributors. iTEP maintains affiliations with over 1,000 institutions and operates a broad network of partners that spans Asia, the Americas, Europe, and parts of the Middle East and North Africa (MENA). Several of iTEP's assessments have received government recognition and validation in a number of countries.

== Current Products and Exams ==
iTEP offers a suite of online English proficiency assessments designed for academic, professional, and personal uses. All exams are administered online and most are available on demand. Scores are reported on a scale of 0 to 6 in 0.5‑point increments for each skill section and are aligned with the Common European Framework of Reference for Languages (CEFR). The iTEP Placement, however, is graded on an 1-8 level scale.

=== Academic Exams ===
iTEP Academic Plus is designed for colleges, universities, and intensive English programs Many iTEP Partner schools accept the iTEP Academic Plus for admissions. It assesses five skill areas: grammar, listening, reading, writing, and speaking. It is used for admissions screening, placement into language‑support programs, and progress and exit testing.

iTEP SLATE Plus (Secondary Level Assessment Test of English) is designed for middle school, secondary school, and high school students. It is used by international schools, boarding schools, and secondary education programs to support admissions decisions and to monitor the English language development of multilingual learners throughout their academic journey.

The test provides reliable measures of students' English proficiency for initial placement, admissions screening, and ongoing EAL/ELL progress monitoring. It evaluates the key language skills required for academic success, including grammar, listening, reading, writing, and speaking, enabling schools to make informed decisions and track student growth over time.

iTEP Placement Plus is used by language programs for pre‑arrival and on‑site level testing. The exam assesses grammar, vocabulary, reading, listening, and, in the Plus version, writing and speaking. Score reports for placement exams are generally released directly to the administering institution rather than to the individual test‑taker.

The Academic and SLATE exams retail for $141 USD and are taken on demand, making iTEP one of the most flexible and least expensive options among its competitors, which include TOEFL and IELTS. All exams last 90 minutes. Institutions administering iTEP exams on-site receive discounted rates. iTEP also creates customized or white label tests for educational institutions.

=== Career Exams ===
iTEP Interview is a targeted exam that focuses exclusively on listening and speaking skills. It is intended for employers and programs that need a quick, focused measure of a candidate’s ability to communicate in spoken English. The exam can be taken in 30 minutes.

iTEP All Skills is a comprehensive workplace assessment covering career speaking, language usage, reading, and writing. It is designed for employers and institutions that need a full‑spectrum evaluation of professional English proficiency. The exam lasts 75 minutes.

Results for both the iTEP Interview and the All Skills are immediate. Like with iTEP's other exams, the career exams are also on-demand and can be white labeled.

=== Available Preparation Materials ===
- Self‑paced online preparation courses: paid prep courses (over 30 hours of content) for iTEP Academic‑Plus, iTEP and SLATE‑Plus, including practice questions, skills instruction, and embedded practice tests. Each course costing $45.
- Practice tests (Practice Basic, Practice PLUS, and multi‑test bundles): paid online practice tests that simulate the official exam format and question types for the Academic and SLATE exams. Basic practice test (SLATE and Academic) costing $15 with grading of only three skills. Practice Plus (Academic only) costing $30 with all 5 skills graded. Multi test bundles (3 Academic basic practice tests) costing $36 for three versions of the Academic basic practice exam.
- Practice/“Practice Guide” materials: additional official practice content and units focusing on listening, reading, grammar, and academic topics.
- Official iTEP Preparation Guide (Prep‑Guide): a comprehensive study guide with sample questions, answer explanations, skill‑building exercises, and tips covering grammar, listening, reading, writing, and speaking for multiple iTEP exams.
- Free sample tests and preview tests: free online sample and preview tests, including a Social English exam, that allow users to experience iTEP question formats and receive unofficial results.

== Scoring ==
Most iTEP scores are reported on a scale of 0.0 to 6.0 in increments of 0.5 for each skill section. An overall iTEP score is calculated from the component scores and is similarly reported on the same 0.0 to 6.0 scale. Score reports are typically delivered to institutions or test‑takers within approximately 24 hours of exam completion for most exam types, with the exception of exams that are selected for additional review.

iTEP scores are aligned with the Common European Framework of Reference for Languages (CEFR), which ranges from A1 (beginner) to C2 (mastery). This alignment allows institutions to benchmark iTEP results against internationally recognized language proficiency levels and compare them with scores from other major English language assessments.

Institutions may choose the version that best matches their assessment needs, such as full‑skills academic admissions, secondary‑school screening, workplace evaluation, or speaking‑focused assessment. Score reports reflect performance on each individual section as well as an overall proficiency score or band. iTEP scores are valid for two years from the test date.

=== iTEP Academic PLUS Scoring ===
Multiple-choice sections are scored instantly; Writing and Speaking samples are graded by ESL-trained native English speakers, with results typically available within 24 hours.

CEFR Level	CEFR Descriptor	iTEP Score	What it means
A1	Beginner	0.0 – 1.9	Can understand and use familiar everyday expressions and very basic phrases.
A2	Elementary	2.0 – 2.4	Can communicate in simple, routine tasks on familiar topics.
B1	Intermediate	2.5 – 3.4	Can deal with most situations likely to arise while traveling and produce simple connected text.
B2	Upper Intermediate	3.5 – 4.4	Can interact with a degree of fluency and produce clear, detailed text on a wide range of subjects.
C1	Advanced	4.5 – 5.4	Can express ideas fluently and use language flexibly for social, academic, and professional purposes.
C2	Mastery	5.5 – 6.0	Can understand virtually everything heard or read and express themselves spontaneously and precisely.

=== iTEP SLATE Plus Scoring ===
Multiple-choice sections are scored instantly; Writing and Speaking samples are graded by ESL-trained native English speakers, with results typically available within 24 hours.

CEFR Level	CEFR Descriptor	iTEP Score	What it means
A1	Beginner	0.0 – 2.4	Recognizes basic words and very simple instructions in classroom contexts.
A2	Elementary	2.5 - 3.9	Understands familiar school topics and can produce short, simple statements.
B1	Intermediate	4.0 – 4.9	Can follow most secondary-school instruction and write short connected texts.
B2	Upper Intermediate	5.0 – 5.9	Can engage with academic content, discussions, and longer written tasks confidently.
C1	Advanced	6.0	Operates at near-native academic proficiency for secondary-level coursework.

=== iTEP Placement ===
Multiple-choice sections are scored instantly; Writing and Speaking samples are graded by ESL-trained native English speakers, with results typically available within 24 hours. The iTEP Placement is graded on an 8 point scale, different from the other exams to provide more in-depth information for placement. The exam only reaches a cefr level of b2+.

CEFR Level	CEFR Descriptor	iTEP Score	What it means
A1	Emerging	1	Can use basic memorized words and expressions.
A1+	Beginning low	2	Can understand slow speech and respond to basic questions about familiar topics.
A2	Beginning mid	3	Can understand frequently used expressions about routine topics and participate in short exchanges with limitations.
A2+	Beginning High	4	Can participate in communicative exchanges but make systematic mistakes. Can interact with texts that are familiar.
B1	Intermediate low	5	Can understand main ideas on familiar and some unfamiliar topics across contexts. Can deal with everyday situations and provide opinions and plans.
B1+	Intermediate mid	6	Can communicate with ease across topics and contexts. Generally good control but with frequent mistakes. Can participate in conversations with native speakers with some need of clarificaion.
B2	Intermediate high	7	Can interact with a degree of fluency and spontaneity with regular interaction with native speakers.
B2+	post-intermediate	8	Can communicate spontaneously with fluency and easy of expression.

== Linking iTEP Scores to Other Assessments ==
Because iTEP scores are aligned with the CEFR, institutions can broadly compare iTEP results with scores from other major English-language tests. The table below provides approximate equivalencies between iTEP Academic scores, IELTS band scores, and TOEFL iBT scores using the new 1 – 6 band scale (introduced January 2026, in 0.5-point increments). These equivalencies are approximate and should not be used as direct substitutes for official score conversions. During the TOEFL transition period (January 2026 – January 2028), score reports continue to show a comparable 0 – 120 figure alongside the new band score, so you may also see legacy 0 – 120 numbers in circulation.

CEFR Level	iTEP Score	Approx. TOEFL iBT (1 – 6)	Approx. Duolingo	Approx. IELTS Band	Approx. PTE Academic
C2	5.5 - 6.0	6.0	155 - 160	8.5 – 9.0	85 - 90
C1	4.5 - 5.4	5.0 – 5.5	130 - 150	7.0 – 8.0	76 - 84
B2	3.5 - 4.4	4.0 - 4.5	100 - 125	5.5 – 6.5	59 - 75
B1	2.5 - 3.4	3.0 - 3.5	60 - 95	4.0 – 5.0	43 - 58
A2	2.0 - 2.4	3.0 - 4.5	10-55	3.0 - 3.5	30 - 42
A1	0.5 - 1.9	1 - 1.5	10-55	2.0 - 2.5	10 - 29

Sources: TOEFL iBT 1 – 6 band alignment per ETS's January 2026 score scale update; iTEP / IELTS / CEFR equivalencies based on each organization's published CEFR alignment. For official comparisons, refer to each test maker's documentation.

- TOEFL Score Scale Update — ETS
- IELTS scoring
- Duolingo scoring
- PTE scoring

== Affiliated organizations ==
- TESOL - TESOL International Association.
- NAFSA
- English USA
