= Vantage College =

- Type: College run by the University of British Columbia
- Location: Vancouver, British Columbia, Canada; 49.2600°N 123.2514°W
- Campus: Urban

Vantage College provides interdisciplinary programming, and it is operated by the University of British Columbia exclusively for international students. It charges a program fee that is not funded by the provincial government. It is a first-year program for students that do not meet UBC's English language admission standards.

== Controversy ==
The decision to develop Vantage College attracted criticism from students and faculty at the University of British Columbia for targeting overseas students, being seen as a poor spending decision that fails to significantly benefit the student body at-large.
