= Oulton College =

Private college in Moncton, New Brunswick, Canada

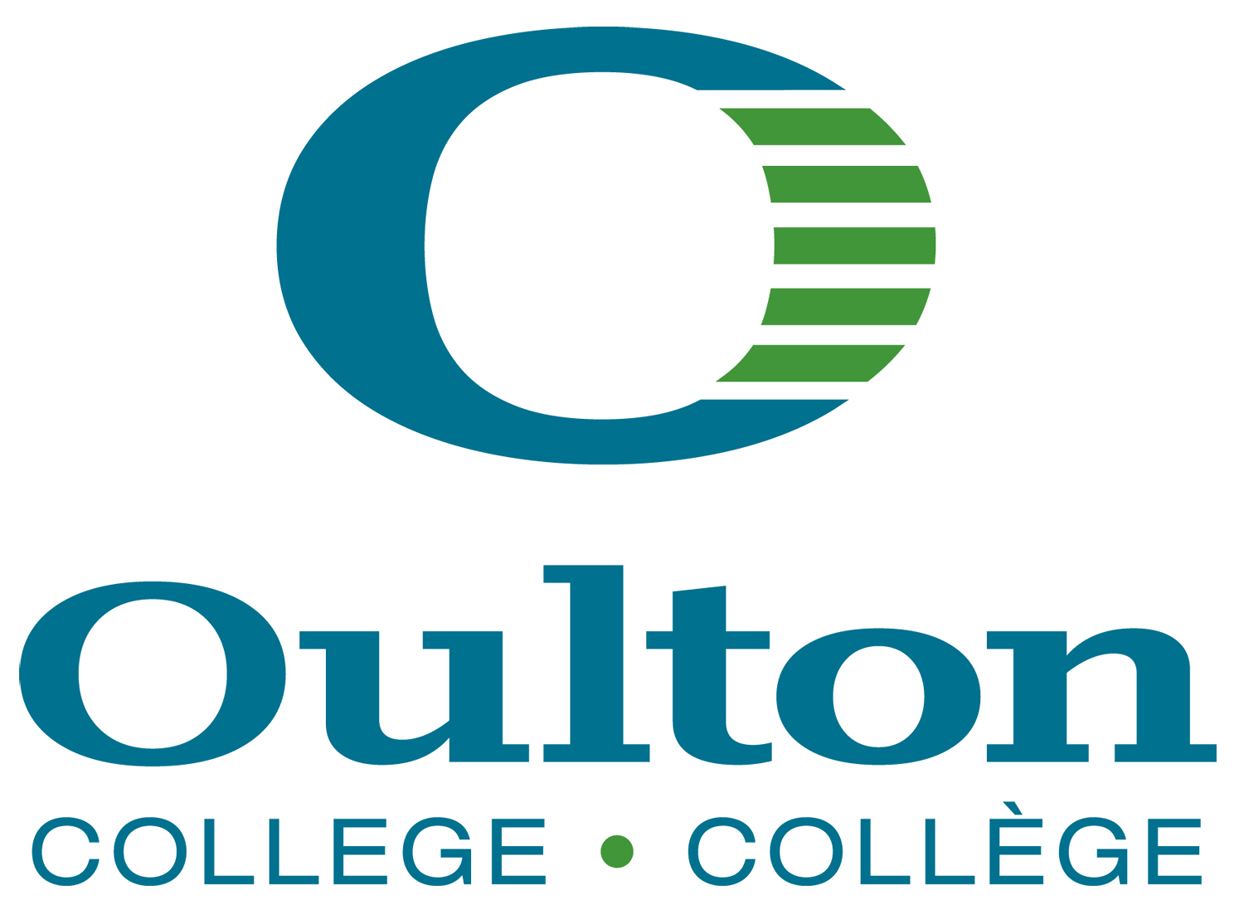
- Motto: "Your Future Starts Here"
- Type: Private
- Established: 1956
- Affiliations: National Association of Career Colleges
- President: Darcie Reidpath
- Students: 700+
- Location: 4 Flanders Court, Moncton, New Brunswick, Canada; 46.094156°N 64.800299°W
- Campus: Urban
- Colors: Green & Teal
- Website: www.oultoncollege.com

Oulton College is a Canadian private college situated in Moncton, New Brunswick, Canada. The college offers programs in four faculties: Business, Health Science, Human Services and Information Technology.

== History ==
=== Foundation and early years ===
Gordon A. Oulton founded Oulton's Business College in 1956, after having spent the previous 19 years as an Instructor and Principal at Robinson Business College in Moncton. Oulton's goal was to run a progressive business college catering to the business needs of the day by offering training in Accounting, Stenography, Short Hand, Manual Typing, Business Machines, and Letter Writing. In its first year of operation the College had approximately 80 students and six staff members. Oulton's Business College was first located at 599 Main Street in the Humphrey Block of downtown Moncton.

At the age of 18, Donald Fontaine began teaching at the College and was one of the original staff members. Along with his teaching responsibilities, he later accepted the position of Vice-Principal. After 27 years of service Fontaine was given ownership of the College in 1983. At that time, the College continued to offer business training and numbered approximately 230 students with 10 staff members.

In 1987, as original staff members were preparing for retirement and major changes in curriculum were being implemented due to the arrival of modern computers, Fontaine decided to sell the College to James Denton, but remained at the College as an Instructor and Principal. Additional programs were offered in such fields as Travel & Tourism, Medical Office Administration, Banking, and Paralegal. That year the College moved from its original location on Main Street to a more spacious building at 107 Robinson Street in downtown Moncton.

Due to family health reasons, Denton decided to move to Phoenix, Arizona in 1994. In the mid 1990s, courses in Computer Programming and networking were introduced in order to meet the demands of a growing Information Technology Industry. During this period the College witnessed a change in name from Oulton’s Business College to Oulton College. In 2001, the College moved to a larger facility located at 55 Lutz Street in downtown Moncton where new programs began to be offered in Policing & Corrections, Child & Youth Care, Pharmacy Technician, Veterinary Technician, Dental Assistant, Early Childhood Education, and Dental Hygiene. In 2007, a separate dental clinic opened on Pacific Avenue, which houses the Dental Hygiene and Dental Assistant students, as well as offering cleanings at a discounted rate to the public.

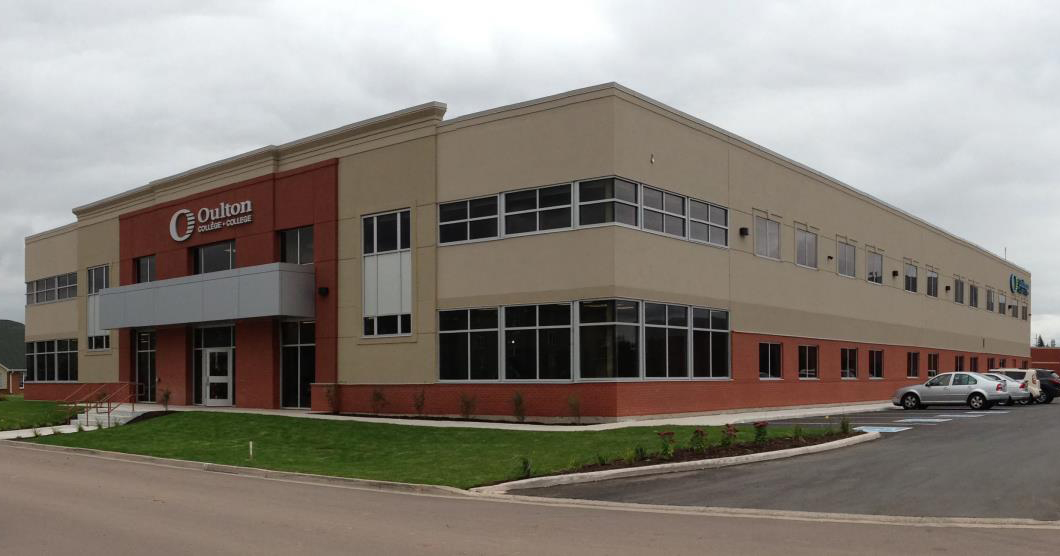
The Main Campus located on Flanders Court

=== Present day ===
In 2011 the College began construction on the Flanders Court campus in Moncton. The Flanders Court campus, which opened in September 2012, replaced classes located in downtown Moncton and the head office on Lutz Street. The College's Dental Education Centre still operates at the Pacific Avenue campus. Today, the enrolment has grown from an initial first class of 80 students studying accounting, stenography and other business skills, to a student population of over 715 spread across the faculties of Business, Health Sciences, Human Services and Information & Technology. The College operates with a faculty and administration team of over 80.

In 2024, Oulton College has developed a new program addition, the Bachelor of Science in Nursing. This is the first degree level program to be offered at a private college in the Atlantic Provinces, and the institution has gone through rigorous assessment from the Maritime Provinces Higher Education Commission.

== Faculties and programs ==
Oulton College offers 18 programs in four faculties. Administrative offices and most classes are located in the Flanders Court campus, however students in the dental program study at the Dental Education Centre located on Pacific Avenue. And the new Elmwood campus.

- Faculty of Business
  - Medical Office Administration
  - Business Management and Entrepreneurship
  - Sales, Marketing & Business Development
  - Paralegal / Legal
  - Travel & Hospitality
- Faculty of Health Sciences
  - Bachelor of Science in Nursing
  - Practical Nurse
  - Dental Assistant Level 2
  - Dental Hygiene
  - Medical Laboratory Assistant
  - Medical Laboratory Technology
  - Primary Care Paramedic
  - Veterinary Assistant
  - Veterinary Technician
- Faculty of Human Services
  - Early Childhood Education & Educational Assistant
  - Human Services Counselor
  - Policing & Corrections
- Faculty of Information & Technology
  - System Management and Cyber Security
