= IDP Education =

International education organisation

IDP Education Limited
- Formerly: International Development Program (1969–2003)
- Traded as: ASX: IEL
- Founded: 1969; 57 years ago
- Headquarters: Melbourne, Australia
- Owner: Education Australia (25%)
- Website: www.idp.com

IDP Education Limited is an international education organisation offering student placement in Australia, New Zealand, United States, United Kingdom, Ireland and Canada.

== History ==
IDP was established in 1969 as the Australian Asian Universities' Cooperation Scheme (AAUCS) to assist universities in South-East Asia with development. In 1981, AAUCS changed its name to the International Development Program (IDP) of Australian Universities and Colleges and schools.

In 2006, SEEK acquired 50% of the shares of IDP from the Australian universities consortium Education Australia. Education Australia was formerly known as IDP Education Australia Limited.

In 2015, IDP became a listed company, and SEEK sold its 50% shares to the general public.

In January 2017, IDP acquired UK Educational listings company Hotcourses for £30 million. Hotcourses was co-founded by British politician and former Foreign Secretary Jeremy Hunt.

In April 2020, IDP issued new shares that raised AU$175 million. In June, Education Australia, the holding company for the 38 universities of Australia (note: there are more than 38 universities in Australia; some of them are not the shareholders of Education Australia), sold 5% shares to the public. In March 2021, Education Australia announced to sell a further 15% shares to the public and announced that the remaining 25% shares of IDP would be distributed to the 38 universities.
