= College of Immigration and Citizenship Consultants =

Canadian federal regulatory authority

The College of Immigration and Citizenship Consultants
- Collège des consultants en immigration et en citoyenneté

Agency overview
- Formed: 2011
- Preceding agency: Canadian Society of Immigration Consultants
- Headquarters: 5500 North Service Road, Burlington, Ontario L7L 6W6
- Minister responsible: Rachel Bendayan, Minister of Immigration, Refugees and Citizenship
- Website: college-ic.ca/

The College of Immigration and Citizenship Consultants (the College, CICC French: Collège des consultants en immigration et en citoyenneté, CCIC) is the Canada-wide regulatory college created to protect consumers by overseeing regulated immigration and citizenship consultants and international student advisors.

Pursuant to the College of Immigration and Citizenship Consultants Act (S.C. 2019, c. 29, s. 292) the College Act, the opening of the College was established by a Ministerial Order, which approved the previous regulator, the Immigration Consultants of Canada Regulatory Council ICCRC, to continue as the College. The College officially opened on November 23, 2021.

According to Canadian federal law, immigration consultants who provide their assistance for Canadian immigration or international student services for a fee need to be registered with the College and must be accredited as Regulated Canadian Immigration Consultants (RCICs) or Regulated International Student Immigration Advisors (RISIAs), respectively. (To act as an immigration consultant in Quebec, a person must be registered with the College, recognized by the Ministry of Immigration, Francisation and Integration, and registered on the Registre québécois des consultants en immigration.)

Its head office is located in Burlington, Ontario.

== Mandate and legal framework ==
Financially self-funded and self-sustaining, the College is a self-regulatory organization (SRO) that relies on licensee fees.

There are 2 types of immigration and citizenship representatives in Canada: paid (must be authorized) and unpaid. Only authorized representatives may charge a fee or receive any other type of payment for their services. Unpaid representatives can be family members, friends, or other third parties who do not charge a fee. In essence, unpaid representatives may give the same services as paid representatives, but they do it for free.

The federal mandate of the College of Immigration and Citizenship Consultants arises from the College of Immigration and Citizenship Consultants Act, the Immigration and Refugee Protection Act (IRPA) and the Citizenship Act, all of which require anyone in Canada who provides immigration and citizenship advice or representation for a fee "to be a member in good standing of the College, a Canadian law society, or the Chambre des notaires du Québec.

Individuals who provide immigration and citizenship services abroad are subject to Canadian law even when residing outside of Canada.

== History ==
In 2000, the Association of Immigration Counsel of Canada (AICC) and Organization of Professional Immigration Consultants (OPIC) partnered up to establish the Canadian Association of Professional Immigration Consultants (CAPIC), as a regulatory professional organization for immigration and citizenship consultation. The following year, the historic ruling for the case of Law Society of British Columbia v Mangat on 18 October 2001 became a catalyst for the self-regulation ambitions of Canada's immigration consultants.

The following year, OPIC and AICC joined together to form the Canadian Association of Professional Immigration Consultants (CAPIC), thereby succeeding CIPC and adopting its original name. In April 2008, the Parliamentary Committee for Citizenship and Immigration re-examined the subject, travelling across Canada to hear testimony. The Committee concluded by recommending the establishment of "a stand-alone legislation to re-establish the Canadian Society of Immigration Consultants as a non-share capital corporation." In August 2010, Minister of Immigration and Citizenship Jason Kenney called for submissions from prospective regulators and established a committee to select an eventual regulator.

The Immigration Consultants of Canada Regulatory Council (ICCRC) was chosen as the new regulator in 2011, with many of its founding directors being former CAPIC executives.

In June 2019, the College of Immigration and Citizenship Consultants Act was passed by Parliament providing the mandate for a new regulator for Regulated Canadian Immigration Consultants (RCIC) and Regulated International Student Immigration Advisors (RISIAs), called the College of Immigration and Citizenship Consultants (CICC). Coming into force on 26 November 2020, the Act includes, among other things, new powers to identify and pursue unlicensed immigration consultants. The Act was announced by the then Minister of Immigration, Refugees and Citizenship, Marco Mendicino.

The transition process for the College was temporarily delayed due to the COVID-19 pandemic.

The Minister of Immigration, Refugees and Citizenship approved ICCRC’s application for continuance and set the date of continuance as November 23, 2021.

On November 23, 2021, the College of Immigration and Citizenship Consultants officially opened becoming the official regulator of immigration and citizenship consultants across Canada.

== Arms ==
Coat of arms of the former Canadian Society of Immigration Consultants
Adopted 2010 Crest Issuant from a scroll fesswise proper a demi-sun in splendour Argent rayonné Gules Escutcheon Argent between two flaunches Azure set with lines of latitude Argent, a double fleur-de-lis between two maple leaves their stems inward Gules Supporters Two winged polar bears Argent wings inverted Gules standing on a rocky mount proper Motto PROTECTIO HUMANITAS ACCREDITATIO (Latin for 'Protection, humanity, accreditation”')

== See also ==
- Immigration and Refugee Board of Canada
- Canadian Council of Better Business Bureaus
- Canadian Anti-Fraud Centre
- Office of Consumer Affairs
