= Coquitlam College =

College in Canada

- Type: Private International college
- Established: 1982; 44 years ago
- President: Chris Rands
- Students: 2700–4000
- Location: 300-2920 Virtual Way, Vancouver, BC, Canada, V5M 0C4, (Canada) Vancouver, British Columbia, Canada; 49.250563°N 122.8936357°W
- Campus: Vancouver and Surrey
- Colours: Blue; White
- Website: www.coquitlamcollege.com

Coquitlam College is a private post-secondary degree-granting institution in Vancouver, British Columbia. Established in 1982 and authorized by the British Columbia Ministry of Advanced Education to deliver post-secondary education in B.C. under the Degree Authorization Act Coquitlam College offers the following programs: a University Transfer Program, an Associate of Arts Degree Program, a Senior High School Program, and an English Studies Program.

== Campuses ==
- Vancouver Main Campus - located within walking distance of the Renfrew Skytrain station in Vancouver.
- Surrey Satellite Campus - located near the King George Skytrain station in the Surrey, British Columbia suburb of Greater Vancouver.

== History ==
Coquitlam College was established in 1982 as an International college, initially offering senior high school and first- and second-year university studies, but formal English Studies courses were added in 1986. In 1991, Coquitlam College was one of the first private colleges to be added to the BC Transfer Guide, an initiative overseen by the BCCAT to facilitate course credit transfer among post-secondary institutions. In 2013 Coquitlam College was authorized to offer the Associate of Arts Degree

== See also ==
- List of institutes and colleges in British Columbia
- List of universities in British Columbia
- Higher education in British Columbia
- Education in Canada
