= Cultura Inglesa =

English-teaching franchise

Current logo

The Associação Brasileira de Culturas Inglesas (Culturas Inglesas Brazilian Association), widely known simply as Cultura Inglesa (English Culture) is an English-teaching franchise founded in 1934 and with branches present in the Brazilian cities of São Paulo, Rio de Janeiro, Brasília, Belo Horizonte, Goiânia and their surroundings. There are also branches in other states of Alagoas, Rio Grande do Sul, Paraná, Bahia and Espírito Santo.

There, it is possible for its students to take the University of Cambridge ESOL Examinations, including the KET (Key English Test), the PET (Preliminary English Test), the FCE (First Certificate in English), the CAE (Certificate in Advanced English) and the CPE (Certificate of Proficiency in English).

Former logo

In 2009, it has been elected by the Great Place to Work Institute (GPTW) as the 25th best company to work in Brazil In 2012, it was again featured on the list, but in no specific position.

Besides teaching and applying examinations, the company also promotes cultural events focusing on British culture, such as music festivals, which have brought bands such as Franz Ferdinand and The Horrors.
