= Cambridge English Corpus =

Word collection

The 'Cambridge International Corpus (CIC)’ is a collection of over 2 billion words of real spoken and written English . The texts are stored in a database that can be searched to see how English is used. The CIC also contains the Cambridge Learner Corpus, a unique collection of over 60,000 exam papers from Cambridge ESOL. It shows real mistakes students make and highlights the parts of English which cause problems for students.

The Cambridge International Corpus is used to inform Cambridge University Press English Language Teaching publications as well as for research in corpus linguistics. Access is currently restricted to authors and researchers working on projects and publications for Cambridge University Press, and researchers at Cambridge English Language Assessment.

It contains instances of modern written English, taken from newspapers, magazines, novels, letters, emails, textbooks, websites, and many other sources. Its spoken data is taken from many sources, including everyday conversations, telephone calls, radio broadcasts, presentations, speeches, meetings, TV programmes and lectures.

== Cambridge Learner Corpus ==
The Cambridge Learner Corpus (CLC) is a collection of exam scripts written by students learning English, built in collaboration with Cambridge English Language Assessment. The CLC contains scripts from over 180,000 students, from around 200 countries, speaking 138 different first languages and is growing all the time. The exams currently included are:

- KET Key English Test (and KET for schools)
- PET Preliminary English Test (and PET for schools)
- FCE First Certificate in English
- CAE Certificate in Advanced English
- CPE Certificate of Proficiency in English
- BEC Business English Certificate (all levels)
- IELTS International English Language Testing System (academic and general training)
- CELS Certificates in English Language Skills
- ILEC International Legal English Certificate
- ICFE International Certificate in Financial English
- Skills for Life

A unique feature of the Cambridge Learner Corpus is its error coding system. Language specialists identify and annotate errors in the exam scripts. This means that the Corpus can be used to find out about the frequency of different types of errors, the contexts that the errors are made in and the student groups that find particular language areas difficult.

Authors of Cambridge English Language Teaching resources can use this information to target common errors – for example, the Cambridge Advanced Learner’s Dictionary contains ‘Common mistake’ features which highlight frequent learner errors.

Conversely, the error coding system also reveals what students can achieve at each level. This is central to the work of English Profile, a collaborative programme to enhance the learning, teaching and assessment of English worldwide. The founding partners are Cambridge University Press, Cambridge English Language Assessment, the University of Cambridge, the University of Bedfordshire, the British Council and English UK. The project’s aim is to describe what learners know and can do in English at each level of the Common European Framework of Reference (CEFR).

== Specialized corpora ==
The Cambridge English Corpus contains a number of specialized corpora:

=== Cambridge Business English Corpus ===
The Cambridge Business English Corpus is a large collection of British and American business language, including reports and documents, books relating to different aspects of business, and the business sections from many national newspapers.

The Cambridge Business English Corpus also includes the Cambridge and Nottingham Spoken Business English Corpus (CANBEC), the result of a joint project between Cambridge University Press and the University of Nottingham. This is a collection of recordings of English from companies of all sizes, ranging from big multinational companies to small partnerships. It contains formal and informal meetings, presentations, telephone conversations, lunchtime conversations, and spoken language from other business situations.

=== Cambridge Legal English Corpus ===
The Cambridge Legal English Corpus contains books, journals and newspaper articles relating to the law and legal processes.

=== Cambridge Financial English Corpus ===
The Cambridge Financial English Corpus contains texts relating to economics and finance, including leading financial magazines and newspapers.

=== Cambridge Academic English Corpus ===
The Cambridge Academic English Corpus contains written and spoken academic language at undergraduate and post-graduate level from a range of US and UK institutions, including lectures, seminars, student presentations, journals, essays and text books.

=== CANCODE ===
The Cambridge and Nottingham Corpus of Discourse in English (CANCODE) is a collection of spoken English recorded at hundreds of locations across the British Isles in a wide variety of situations (e.g. casual conversation, socialising, finding out information, and discussions). The CANCODE corpus is the result of a joint project between Cambridge University Press and the University of Nottingham.

There are about five million words in the CANCODE corpus, and it's a very rich resource for researchers of spoken English. However, the data does have some limitations. Most people knew they were being recorded, and are chatting in informal situations such as while relaxing at home, with others of fairly equal social status. This means the interactions are generally consensual and collaborative, so the corpus has minimal evidence of conflict or adversarial exchanges

=== Cambridge-Cornell Corpus of Spoken North American English ===
The Cambridge University Press/Cornell Corpus is a large collection of informal, highly interactive, multiparty conversations between family/friends in North America. The Cambridge-Cornell corpus is the result of a joint project between Cambridge University Press and Cornell University.

=== CAMSNAE ===
The Cambridge Corpus of Spoken North American English (CAMSNAE) is a large collection of spoken American English. It includes recordings of people going about their everyday life – at work, at home with their families, going shopping, having meals, etc.

== See also ==
- Cambridge English Language Assessment
- Corpus linguistics
- English Profile
