= Colegio Arji =

Coordinates: 17.9719°N 92.9493°W

Colegio Arjí
- Villahermosa, Tabasco; Mexico

Information
- Type: Private school
- Motto: Conócete a ti mismo.
- Established: 1978
- Headmaster: Graciela Trujillo Zentella
- Website: http://arji.edu.mx

Colegio Arji is a private K-12 school in Villahermosa, Tabasco, Mexico founded in 1978 by Graciela Trujillo de Cobo. The school's motto is "Conócete a ti mismo" (translated to English as "Know yourself"). Its name derives from the Greek word "archi" (translated into English as "beginning"). The school's colors are brown and beige and its mascot is called "Jaguarji", formed by the combination of "jaguar" and "Arji". The mascot is a jaguar, an animal with deep cultural ties to the indigenous people of the local area of Mesoamerica.

Annually the school celebrates the "Día de la Identidad Arji" on October 18, a day devoted to school pride.

Originally, admissions to the school were highly selective as one of the application requirements for prospective students was a personal recommendation from a member of the Arji community. This requirement was later annulled and replaced with mandatory subjects, English, and psychometric tests.

== Class Level Organization ==
The school is divided into 4 levels:

Jardin de Niños (Kindergarten)

- First year (ages 3–4)
- Second year (ages 4–5)
- Third year (ages 5–6)
- Primero de Inglés (First Year of English) (ages 6–7)

Primaria (Elementary)

- First Grade (ages 7–8)
- Second Grade (ages 8–9)
- Third Grade (ages 9–10)
- Fourth Grade (ages 10–11)
- Fifth Grade (ages 11–12)
- Sixth Grade (ages 12–13)

Secundaria (Middle School)

- First year (ages 13–14)
- Second year (ages 14–15)
- Third year (ages 15–16)

Bachillerato (High School)

- First year (ages 16–17)
- Second year (ages 17–18)
- Third year (ages 18–19)

English is taught from the first year of kindergarten and upon passing of the third year, children go into what is called "Primero de Inglés" meaning "First Year of English", instead of going into first grade of Primaria as is common in most schools. The year centers around an immersion program where children are expected to become fluent in English. Their English education then continues throughout elementary, middle school, and high school.

English is taught according to the University of Cambridge Local Examinations Syndicate standards and the school is a test center for their English examinations: Key English Test (KET), Preliminary English Test (PET), First Certificate in English (FCE) and Certificate in Advanced English (CAE).

In July 1988 Colegio Arji became the only school in the state to be part of the International Baccalaureate Organization and has since then been authorized to offer the corresponding International Baccalaureate (IB) Diploma Program. The program is taught in Spanish. Students at the school usually take IB exams in May. The school has been authorized by the IB to offer the IB Middle Years Programme since July 2009, and to offer the IB Primary Years Programme since January 2010. These two programs are taught in English and Spanish.
