= The Anglo Mexican Foundation =

Coordinates: 19°26′7.47″N 99°9′49.41″W

The Anglo Mexican Foundation is a not for profit educational organization located in Mexico with its main offices in Colonia San Rafael in Mexico City. Its main activities are associated with English language teaching, examination preparation, teacher training, scholarships for teachers and cultural activities. The Foundation began as the Instituto Anglo Mexicano de Cultura A.C. in 1943 with the aim of strengthening ties between Mexico and Great Britain through cultural exchange. The Foundation took on its current name in 2003, which was accompanied by a reorganization.

== Schools ==
Most of the instruction associated with the Foundation is through The Anglo, which gives classes in the English language, standardized test preparation and teacher training. English language teaching has been the main activity of the foundation with The Anglo operating for over sixty-eight years. Most of its success comes from the quality and commitment of its teachers and staff. Some of these courses include in house classes or general language and standardized test preparation and specialty courses for businesses. Teacher training and scholarship programs mainly focus on the professional development of Mexican national teachers of English. Programs offered to these teachers include pre service courses such as The Pre school Teaching Course, The Primary Teaching Course and The Teacher Training Course. Some of the in-service courses for teachers are The In-Service Teacher Training Course and The Teacher Development Course. It is worth mentioning that several of these courses have recognition by SEP.

The Anglo is also the largest authorized Cambridge ESOL exam centre in Mexico. Cambridge ESOL, offers the world's leading range of certificates for learners of English. The tests offered by its Centre of Exams Unit are designed at all levels of English from the Key English Test (KET) for the basic level, the Preliminary English Test (PET) for intermediate, the First Certificate in English (FCE) for upper-intermediate, the Certificate in Advanced English (CAE) for advanced learners and the Certificate of Proficiency in English (CPE) for those candidates with a very advanced level of English.

In 1998, the Foundation established The Churchill School and in 2003 The Churchill College. The School provides education for students from kindergarten through primary/middle school. The college focuses on high school/preparatory students. These schools are bilingual with an international focus and are members of the International Baccalaureate Organisation (IB).

== Other programs ==
Since 1943, the Foundation has supported cultural events with the purpose of strengthening ties between Mexico and Great Britain. These include music, theater, dance, visual arts, cinema and conferences. The Foundation also develops cultural materials for both its own and other schools, which occur both in Mexico and the United Kingdom. The Foundation sponsors regularly occurring film events with a schedule available online. Cultural and educational exchanges include representing the GAP Project in Mexico, and offering scholarships as part of the United World Colleges program. Selected candidates complete the English Language Scholarships in different places in the world.

In 2010, the “An encounter with Bob Geldof” conference was held at the National Auditorium. Geldof was accompanied by José Areán, an internationally recognized Mexican musician. Another event in the same year was the presentation of a compilation of letters written in the 19th century about Mexico by Scotswoman Fanny Calderón de la Barca. This was a joint event between the Foundation and the Instituto Nacional de Bellas Artes .

In 2011, cultural offering include readings by Welsh writer Owen Sheers and recitals by pianist Ann Martin-Davis and mezzo-soprano Susan Legg. In collaboration with the Museo Nacional de Arte, the Foundation presents the documentary “No Distance Left to Run” by Will Lovelace and Dylan Southern. With theatre magazine “Paso de Gato,” the Foundation sponsored an event dedicated to English theatre inviting critics such as Aleks Sierz of In-yer-face theatre, Scottish critic Mark Fisher and Michael Billington, a critic based in London. The event was dedicated analyzing British theatre since World War II .

The Anglo Mexican Foundation has a public library, with over 28,000 books in English and 11,000 patrons, The Anglo Library is the largest library in English in the country, its collection includes books about all the subjects, not only ELT.
