= English Profile =

English Profile is an interdisciplinary research programme designed to enhance the learning, teaching and assessment of English worldwide. The aim of the programme is to provide a clear benchmark for progress in English by clearly describing the language that learners need at each level of the Common European Framework of Reference for Languages (CEFR). By making the CEFR more accessible, English Profile will provide support for the development of curricula and teaching materials, and in assessing students' language proficiency.

== Development ==
English Profile is a collaborative programme which involves a number of different partner organisations. The founding partners in English Profile are the University of Cambridge (Cambridge University Press, Cambridge English Language Assessment, the Department of Theoretical and Applied Linguistics), the University of Bedfordshire (CRELLA - the Centre for Research in English Language Learning and Assessment), the British Council and English UK. In addition to this, English Profile has a growing number of Network Partners including universities, schools, language training centres and government departments, as well as individual researchers and language specialists. The English Profile Programme is endorsed by the Council of Europe and financially supported by the European Union Lifelong Learning Programme 2007–2013. Cambridge University Press and Cambridge English Language Assessment are the main funding partners and together coordinate all aspects of the programme.

English Profile combines three elements to develop a reliable approach to describing the English Language:

• World-leading research – from key specialists at the University of Cambridge (including Cambridge English Language Assessment and Cambridge University Press), the University of Bedfordshire (CRELLA), the University of Nottingham, as well as other researchers in applied linguistics around the world.

• Data from actual use – including the multi-billion word Cambridge English Corpus (CEC) and a range of other corpora from various universities and institutions around the world.

• Analysis of existing courses – such as popular English Language Teaching (ELT) course books, curricula, exam specifications/wordlists, etc.

== Benefits of using English Profile ==
English Profile provides information for:

• Curriculum planners

• Teachers

• Materials writers

• Test developers

• Researchers

The English Profile Programme will provide these English Language Teaching (ELT) professionals with help through:

• The English Vocabulary Profile – a database of information on vocabulary for each level of the Common European Framework of Reference for Languages (CEFR).

• The English Grammar Profile – a database of information on grammatical structures for each CEFR level

• The English Profile community website

• The English Profile Journal

• Word of the Week email updates

• A series of research publications

== English Profile resources 2009-2012 ==
To date, English Profile researchers have developed a number of resources designed to inform the English Language Teaching (ELT) community.

=== English Profile community website ===
The English Profile website is the main source of communication between English Profile partners and the programme’s widespread network. It is regularly updated with the latest news, events, research findings and resources emerging from the programme. There are also a wide range of interactive features available to visitors including a public forum, events calendar and preview of the forthcoming A1-C2 level English Vocabulary Profile. Visitors to the website are given the opportunity to register to receive monthly e-newsletters, subscribe/unsubscribe to Word of the Week email updates, and to contact the internal team with any queries, comments or feedback they have relating to the website and/or the resources made available to them.

=== English Vocabulary Profile ===
The English Vocabulary Profile is a reference source for teachers, materials writers, test developers and anyone involved in syllabus design. The resource provides a fully searchable listing of words and phrases in English at each level of the Common European Framework of Reference (CEFR). Based on extensive analysis of word frequency and real learner language use, they offer reliable information at both word and sense level. The English Vocabulary Profile:

• contains words, phrases, phrasal verbs and idioms

• presents the level of each meaning of a word in CEFR order, to suggest learning priorities

• provides detailed dictionary-style entries with clear definitions, grammatical information and guidewords to meanings

• includes audio and written pronunciations

• contains many real examples, from dictionaries and from actual learners at an appropriate level

• can be searched according to different filters, including parts of speech, grammar, usage, topic and affixes

English Vocabulary Profile research has been substantially but not exclusively corpus-informed. English Profile researchers have used the Cambridge Learner Corpus (CLC) – a corpus of written learner English that forms part of the Cambridge English Corpus (CEC). The CLC includes student writing from 203 countries worldwide and across all six levels of the CEFR. In combination with this corpus evidence, researchers have monitored a range of classroom-based sources, including wordlists from leading coursebooks, readers’ wordlists and the content of vocabulary skills books. They have also referred to the Vocabulary Lists for the Key English Test (KET) and Preliminary English Test (PET) examinations, which have been in use since 1994 and have been regularly updated to reflect language change and patterns of use. Finally, even though it was published thirty years ago, the Cambridge English Lexicon by Roland Hindmarsh proved invaluable as a checking source, where the language has not evolved over time.

The A1-C2 English Vocabulary Profile is now available on the project website and available to all for a limited time for free after registration.

Word of the Week is a free subscription service which offers the public an insight into the English Vocabulary Profile during its closed period of validation and testing. The Word of the Week feature is available on the English Profile website and displays an entry from the English Vocabulary Profile, along with a short commentary by the Chief Research Editor working on the resource.

=== English Grammar Profile ===
English Profile researchers developed the English Grammar Profile, which provides data-driven guidance on which grammatical features characterise learners’ output at each level of the Common European Framework of Reference for Languages (CEFR). Using data from the Cambridge Learner Corpus (CLC), the EGP has analysed which aspects of English Grammar - both structural and functional - are typically mastered at each CEFR level. This information is publicly available free-of-charge for non-commercial use on the English Profile site: http://www.englishprofile.org/english-grammar-profile

=== English Profile Information Booklet/Handbook ===
In April 2011, English Profile launched version 1.0 of the English Profile Information Booklet. This booklet provides information on the different strands of the English Profile Programme and is aimed at teachers, curriculum planners, writers and other English Language Teaching (ELT) professionals. The booklet is intended to help them make decisions about which English language points are suitable for learning at each level of the Common European Framework of Reference for Languages (CEFR).

A more substantial handbook, which will include comprehensive information on the research emerging from the English Profile Programme, is currently in development and will be publicly available from January 2012 at English Profile seminars, ELT events and in a downloadable format on the English Profile website.

=== English Profile Journal ===
In September 2010, Cambridge Journals Online and the English Profile Programme launched the first volume of the online English Profile Journal. Articles in the English Profile Journal are freely available to all, and future articles will be published on an incremental basis. The English Profile Journal will publish research emerging out of the English Profile Programme. The first volume contains an introduction by the editors, in which they set out the journal’s mission statement, a series of papers on English Profile research that were presented at the February 2009 English Profile seminar, and a report by Professor John Trim (Council of Europe) on the February 2010 English Profile seminar.

=== English Profile Studies series ===
The English Profile Studies series is jointly produced by the Cambridge English Language Assessment and Cambridge University Press. The series publishes volumes focusing on important developments related to the comprehensive objectives of the English Profile Programme. Titles in this series are designed to be of interest to a wide range of users who are interested in English language, language learning and linguistics; including teachers, curriculum designers and educational policy-makers, as well as language test developers, academic lecturers and researchers. The first in this series of publications is entitled Criterial Features in L2 English. This volume by Hawkins and Filipovic introduces the concept of criteriality, i.e. the properties of learner language which are characteristic and indicative of L2 proficiency at each level of the Common European Framework of Reference for Languages (CEFR). The second volume in the series, Language Functions Revisited by Antony Green, introduces the theoretical and empirical bases for defining English language learning levels in functional ‘Can-Do’ terms. The third volume in the series, is Immigrant pupils learn English, by Bronagh Catabusic and David Little. This volume reports on a longitudinal study of the acquisition of English L2 by children from immigrant families in Ireland. The study explored the extent to which these children's L2 development confirmed the learning trajectory hypothesised in the English Language Proficiency Benchmarks (pdf), the officially sanctioned framework developed for Irish primary schools. The Benchmarks are an adaptation of the first three levels (A1 - B1) of the CEFR.

=== Cambridge English Profile Corpus (in development) ===
The Cambridge English Profile Corpus (CEPC) is a corpus of learner English produced by students worldwide, and is being built by Cambridge University Press and the Cambridge English Language Assessment, in collaboration with a network of participating educational establishments across the world. These establishments include schools, universities, and private language schools, along with research centres, government bodies (such as ministries of education) and individual education professionals.

The CEPC aims to provide 10 million words of data, covering both spoken and written language. Both General English and English for Specific Purposes are included. Written data is being collected via the online English Profile data collection portal. The corpus covers Common European Framework of Reference for Languages (CEFR) levels A1-C2, and attempts to maintain a balance across a number of variables, including proficiency level, first language, and educational context.

The CEPC allows a number of filtering options:

• educational contexts (e.g. primary or secondary, monolingual or bilingual)

• task type e.g. letter, email, report, essay (written data)

• type of interaction e.g. casual conversation, formal presentation, oral exam, classroom discourse, role play etc. (spoken data)

• specific domains (e.g. medical English, business English)

• first language of learners

• age range of learners, and other demographic information

• country of data collection

The CEPC will allow the development of an innovative and unique methodology for describing the English language. This methodology, based as it is on corpus research, will be empirical and not solely concerned with the English spoken by native speakers.
