= Cambridge English Qualifications =

Exam series for learners of English as a second or foreign language

Cambridge English Qualifications are a graduated series of exams designed to assess competency in English for learners of English as a second or foreign language. The Cambridge English Qualifications are based on the candidate's scoring on the Cambridge English Scale which is a single range of scores used to report results for Cambridge English Language Assessment exams. It was introduced in January 2015, with Cambridge English Scale scores replacing the standardised score and candidate profile used for exams taken pre-2015. The scale aims to provide exam users with more detailed information about their exam performance than was previously available.

Each of the qualifications is also aligned with a level of the Common European Framework of Reference (CEFR). Cambridge English Qualifications are set and administered by Cambridge Assessment English (previously known as Cambridge English Language Assessment and the University of Cambridge ESOL examination).

== History ==
Cambridge Assessment English exams, starting with C2 Proficiency in 1913, B2 First in 1939, and B1 Preliminary in 1980, gave learners and teachers different curriculum and examination levels. By the early 1990s, with the addition of A2 Key and C1 Advanced, Cambridge English exams provided a range of different curriculum and examination levels.

The concept of a framework of reference levels for English language learning, teaching and assessment, laid the foundations for the development of the Common European Framework of Reference for Languages (CEFR).

During the mid-1990s, Cambridge Assessment English and other founding members of the newly formed Association of Language Testers in Europe (ALTE) then worked to relate different language qualifications within a shared framework of reference. The ALTE Framework was developed simultaneously alongside the Common European Framework of Reference (CEFR) published in draft form in 1997. Both frameworks share a common conceptual origin, similar aims and comparable scales of empirically developed descriptors.

== The qualifications ==
Each of the Cambridge English Qualifications focuses on a level of the Common European Framework of Reference (CEFR).

There are Cambridge English Qualifications for schools, general and higher education, and business.

Cambridge English Qualifications: Schools	Cambridge English Qualifications: General and Higher Education	Cambridge English Qualifications Business
Pre A1 Starters A1 Movers A2 Flyers A2 Key for Schools B1 Preliminary for Schools B2 First for Schools C1 Advanced C2 Proficiency	A2 Key B1 Preliminary B2 First C1 Advanced C2 Proficiency	B1 Business Preliminary B2 Business Vantage C1 Business Higher

== Research basis ==
Assessment at different levels gives learners clear goals to work towards during language learning, with each level corresponding to a meaningful improvement in language competency.

The study of how learners are motivated was pioneered in the post-war years by John William Atkinson at the University of Michigan. In his book Motivation and Achievement, Atkinson argued that motivation is increased when there is an attainable goal in an activity that is highly valued.

John Hattie and Helen Timperley of the University of Auckland argue that assessment feedback is most effective when it relates to specific tasks and focuses on how to improve. They propose that there are three important questions for learners:

- What are my goals?
- What progress am I making towards them?
- What activities are needed to make better progress?

Cambridge English Qualifications aim to provide information about the learners’ level in each language skill (reading, writing, speaking and listening), to enable learners to take action on problem areas and monitor their progress. This is also designed to allow students to be actively involved in their learning, and gain self-confidence as they move to the next level.

== See also ==
- Cambridge Assessment English
- Common European Framework of Reference for Languages
- Association of Language Testers in Europe
