= Armonicus Cuatro =

Armonicus Cuatro is a group of four vocalists from Mexico: Mario Iván Martínez, Lourdes Ambriz, Nurani Huet and Martín Luna which mostly specializes in European medieval, Renaissance and Baroque music. All four are established musicians in their own right, with Martínez also known as an actor in film and Mexican television. The group has performed widely in Mexico at music and cultural festivals such as the Festival Internacional Cervantino as well as in Europe.

== Members ==
Armonicus Cuatro consists of four recognized Mexican singers: tenor Mario Iván Martínez, soprano Lourdes Ambriz, mezzo-soprano Nurani Huet and baritone Martín Luna. The artists created the group in order to promote works primarily for voice based on the works of early and classical music.

Mario Iván Martínez comes from a family of artists, with mother actress Margarita Isabel and father television announcer Mario Ivan Martinez Ortega along with other relatives who are actors, producers, directors and technicians in radio, cinema, television and theater. He studied theater and music in Mexico City, Los Angeles and England. He was a member of the Coro Convivium Musicum which specialized in the works of Bach, Mozart, Beethoven, Brahms and Orff. As a member of the Ars Nova Singers, he participated in music festivals in Mexico, South America and Europe, appearing on four albums. He has also worked with the National Symphonic Orchestra, the OFUNAM, Horacio Franco and Alberto Cruzprieto. With lute player Antonio Corona, he recorded an album called Músic en la Obra y el Tiempo de Shakespeare.

Martínez is also a professional storyteller. As such, he has adapted texts by Shakespeare, Francisco de Quevedo and Marguerite Yourcenar into modern Spanish. He also presented the monologue Legends of Ancient Mexico in London and Mexico City, based on texts on Nahua culture by Patrick Johansson, as part of a project sponsored by The Anglo Mexican Foundation. As an actor, he appeared in a work called 1822, el ano que fuimos Imperio about the short reign of Agustin de Iturbide as well as the film Like Water for Chocolate and Cronos, and telenovelas such as La Antorcha Encendida. He also works with the National Theatre Company of Mexico and Televisa.

Lourdes Ambriz, soprano, was mostly associated with opera, chamber, renaissance and contemporary music. She worked with directors such as Charles Bruck, Eve Queler, Lukas Foss, Enrique Ricci, Miguel Roa and Eduardo Mata and collaborated with singers such as Plácido Domingo, Guillermo Sarabia, Justino Díaz, Francisco Araiza, Ramón Vargas, Francisco Araiza and Fernando de la Mora. She performed solo at with the Dallas Symphony Orchestra, the San Francisco Symphony the Prague Opera Orchestra and the Opera of Málaga. She was a member of groups such as Arditti Quartet, Ars Nova, Streghe, Kairós and La Décima Musa. She recorded four albums including Cuerpo del verano along with recordings of operas such as Aura by Lavita, The Visitors by Chávez, Montezuma by Graun, El Coyote y el Conejo by Rascado as well as pieces by Hilda Paredes and Victor Rasgado. She toured Europe, the Americas, North Africa and the Middle East and participated in the Festival Internacional Cervantino, the Festival de México, the Festival de Sinaloa as well as festivals in South America, North Africa and the Middle East.

Nurani Huet is a mezzo-soprano who studied at the National Conservatory of Music in Mexico City and later at the Royal Conservatory of The Hague in the Netherlands, specializing in the medieval, renaissance and Baroque periods. Since graduating, she has performed with various vocal/instrumental groups such as the Baroque Ensamble of the Koninklijk Conservatorium at The Hague, the Coro Mexicano de Canto Gregorio Melos Glorie, the Opus 6 Vocal Sextet, the Le Streghe Female Cuartet of Contemporary Music and the Capella Baroque Ensemble. As a soloist, her work has mostly concentrated on Italian, English and German Baroque pieces as well as oratory, lied and contemporary music. In addition to Armonicus Cuatro, she is also a member of the La Spiritata Instrumental Group of Early Music and the Coro de Madrigalistas at the Palacio de Bellas Artes.

Martin Luna is a baritone who received his training at the Instituto Cardenal Miranda. As a soloist, his repertory has including works such as Magnificat (J.S. Bach); Misa en do mayor KV 317 Krönungsmesse y Requiem (W. A. Mozart); Requiem (G. Fauré); Liebeslieder and Ein Deutsches Requiem (J. Brahms); The Messiah (G. F. Händel); Misse solennelle de Sainte-Cécile (CH. Gounod); Les sept paroles du Christ (Dubois) and the Ninth Choral Symphony (Beethoven). He has performed in many of Mexico’s major theaters and has sung under directors Alfredo Silipigni, Enrique Patrón de Rueda, Guido Maria Guida, Enrique Ricci, Eduardo Díaz Muñoz, José Luis Castillo, Juan Trigos and José Guadalupe Flores. He was a member of the Ars Nova group with whom he recorded Love Songs of Renaissance Europe.

== Repertoire ==
The group is described as a theatrical opera ensemble, which specializes in the vocalizations, music and literature of the Medieval, Renaissance and Baroque periods, from Italy, New Spain, Elizabethan England and the Spanish Siglo de Oro. However, they also perform works from the 19th century as well as some modern compositions. It includes music by Juan del Encina, Antonio de Cabezón, Francis Pilkington, Thomas Morley, Thomas Ford, Tomás Luis de Victoria, Jacobus Clemens and Clemen Janequin. It also includes the reading of texts by authors such as Miguel de Cervantes, Francisco de Quevedo and Lope de Vega along with popular poetry from the 16th and 17th centuries.

== Performances ==
As a group, the four musicians have appeared in various places in Mexico and have collaborated with a number of instrumentalists. In Mexico, they have performed at the Ciclo de Música Antigua at the Palacio de Bellas Artes, and held an entire concert dedicated to Baroque composer Henry Purcell at the Museo Nacional del Virreinato as part of the Festival de Música Antigua. At the Cathedral of Durango, they performed a concert called Aires y diretes del Siglo de Oro as part of the Festival de Música Virreinal. They performed at the Festival Internacional Cervantino Barroco in San Cristobal de las Casas in 2008, as well as the Festival Internacional Cervantino in Guanajuato in 2011. For instrumental backup, they often work with keyboardist Karina Peña, and lute and vihuela player Antonio Corona.
