= Bulat (disambiguation) =

Bulat is a given name and surname of Russian and Iranian origin.

Bulat may also refer to:

- Bulat steel, an alloy
- BM Bulat, T-64 main battle tank modernized in Ukraine
- BULATS or Business Language Testing Service for English as a second or foreign language
- SBA-60K2 Bulat, a Russian armored personnel carrier
- T-64BM Bulat, a Ukrainian modernized model of the Soviet T-64 tank
