= OET =

OET may refer to:

- Occupational English Test, a test for health professionals wishing to work or study in Australia.
- Old English Text, a font imitating late medieval English textura letterforms.
