= Linguaskill =

English language proficiency test

Linguaskill; Linguaskill Business
- Linguaskill official logo
- Type: Computer-based adaptive modular multilevel test
- Administrator: Cambridge Assessment English
- Skills tested: Reading; Listening; Writing; Speaking
- Purpose: to evaluate everyday English language skills for work or higher education (Linguaskill); to evaluate business English language skills (Linguaskill Business)
- Year started: 2018
- Score range: 0 to 210, in 1 point increments (min. 140 for certification)
- Score validity: no expiry date
- Languages: English
- Latest update: 2025
- Website: www.cambridgeenglish.org/exams-and-tests/linguaskill/

Linguaskill is a modular online multilevel test of English language proficiency provided by Cambridge Assessment English. It is used by higher education institutions and employers in order to assess the English language skills of students and employees. The test is modular so candidates, institutions, and employers can choose the combination of language skills they want to assess.

== History ==
The development of the first computer-assessment English language test by Cambridge Assessment English dates back to the early 1990s.

The employment agency Manpower approached Cambridge Assessment English in 1994 with a request for a language proficiency test to be used to place staff in temporary employment. The test requirements were as follows:

- it could be administered at any office
- it could be available on demand
- it did not require specially qualified staff to mark it
- it had to be short, yet as reliable as possible
- it had to accurately identify candidates’ practical language ability in a general business setting.

Given these requirements, computer-adaptive testing was identified as the most suitable approach. It satisfied the need for a relatively short test, which would measure accurately over a wide range of levels and would be convenient to administer.

The original Linguaskill ran under MS-DOS. By 1996, it had been replaced by a Windows multimedia version. It was trialled in a number of countries mostly in Europe, but also in Mexico and Japan.

Having successfully demonstrated the use of computer-adaptive testing, a number of further testing projects were undertaken. These have included: CommuniCAT (winner of the 2000 European Academic Software Award), computer based BULATS Online and the Cambridge English Placement Test.

In 2016, a new version of Linguaskill was developed, which was launched globally in 2018. It has been trialled by speakers of over 40 languages, from 50 countries around the world, to ensure the accuracy and reliability of results. This version of the test included two variants (Linguaskill General and Linguaskill Business) each with three modules (Writing, Speaking, and combined Reading and Listening), evaluated candidates on Cambridge English Scale scores 0–180 (correlated to CEFR pre-A1 to above C1), and provided candidates with a "Test Report" of their results.

Cambridge English began introducing a fully-revised version in 2024 and 2025 which rolled out a number of major changes, the most significant of which was making Linguaskill a certificated exam, meaning that it could be used for high stakes purposes such as university admissions and employment. Other changes included:

- renaming Linguaskill General to Linguaskill
- classifying Linguaskill as both general and academic
- separating Reading and Listening into separate modules and incorporating new task types and content
- revising the Speaking and Writing modules
- integrating new security features to prevent malpractice
- scoring candidates only from 140 (CEFR B1), but up to 210 (CEFR C2)
- providing candidates with a Cambridge certificate displaying their results

== Variants ==
The test has two variants: Linguaskill and Linguaskill Business.

=== Linguaskill ===
Linguaskill (formerly Linguaskill General) tests language used in daily life, including, as of the 2024–2025 update, academics. It was designed for admissions in higher education, for measuring progress, or for use as an exit test for higher educational institutions and pathway programs. It has also been used for recruitment in non-business-specific environments. Topics seen on Linguaskill include studying, working, making future plans, travel, and technology. The purported aim of the test is "to assess whether a candidate's English language ability is at a level where they are ready to engage in university activities where they can develop the appropriate academic skills, e.g., research skills, technical literacy, etc."

=== Linguaskill Business ===
Linguaskill Business tests English used in a business or corporate setting. It is aimed at university students on business-related courses or looking to enter the workplace at graduate level, and employees seeking professional development or job promotions. This variant differs from the general test only in content, with topics including buying and selling products or services, the office, business travel, and human resources.

== Format ==
Linguaskill tests are typically taken in a certified testing centre with an invigilator or at a remote venue with online invigilation. In both settings, AI monitoring runs throughout the test and flags any concerns. It is a modular assessment which tests Reading, Listening, Writing, and Speaking. Candidates are not required to sit all modules in one examining session, nor is taking all modules required. This sets Linguaskill apart from other similar tests in that candidates have the flexibility to choose which modules to sit and when, and to retake modules to improve their results without needing to resit the entire exam. The candidate's best score is always retained.

=== Reading ===
The Reading module is adaptive, meaning the number of questions presented to candidates and the duration of the module varies.

Question types which a candidate might encounter include:

- one-question multiple choice: read a short text (a notice, label, text message, email) and choose the sentence or phrase that most closely matches the meaning of the text out of three possible answers
- one-question multiple-choice gap-fill: read a sentence with a missing word and choose the correct word (out of three or four options) to fill the gap
- five-question multiple-choice gap-fill: read a text with five missing words and choose the correct word or phrase (out of three or four options) to fill each gap
- five-question open gap-fill: read a short text with five missing words and write the missing word in each gap
- five-question multiple choice: read a longer text and answer five multiple-choice questions; questions are in the same order as the information in the text
- two-question multiple choice: read a text and answer two multiple-choice questions; questions are in the same order as the information in the text
- missing paragraph text completion: read a text from which five sections have been removed and fill each gap by choosing the appropriate paragraph from six options
- missing sentence text completion: read a text from which five sentences have been removed and fill each gap by choosing the appropriate sentence from eight options
- multiple text matching: read across four texts to find the relevant information to match the prompts or questions

On average, the Reading module takes around 40 minutes, with a maximum time of 59 minutes. The test finishes when the candidate has answered enough questions for Linguaskill to identify their level accurately.

=== Listening ===
The Listening module is also adaptive, so, like the Reading module, the number of questions and the duration vary.

Question types which a candidate might encounter include:

- one-question multiple choice: listen to a short audio recording and answer a multiple-choice question with three options
- five-question multiple choice: listen to a longer recording and answer five multiple-choice questions; questions are in the same order as the information heard in the recording
- two-question multiple choice: listen to a recording and answer two multiple-choice questions; questions are in the same order as the information in the recording
- sentence completion: listen to a recording with one speaker and complete five sentences with no more than three words typed in each space
- one-task multiple matching: listen to five monologues from different speakers and answer a single question for each, choosing from eight options
- two-task multiple matching: listen to three monologues from different speakers and answer two questions for each, choosing from five options

On average, the Listening module takes around 40 minutes, with a maximum time of 59 minutes. The test finishes when the candidate has answered enough questions for Linguaskill to identify their level accurately.

=== Writing ===
The Writing module comprises two tasks, with candidates typing their answers using a computer keyboard. Candidates have 55 minutes to complete the full module.

==== Task 1 – Email ====
Candidates write an email with a recommended minimum of 50 words. The task is the same for both Linguaskill and Linguaskill Business, and it is worth 25% of the final score.

==== Task 2 – Essay/Report ====
Candidates write an essay (Linguaskill) or report (Linguaskill Business) with a recommended minimum of 250 words. It is worth 75% of the final score.

=== Speaking ===
The Speaking module requires candidates to listen to or read instructions or prompts given on screen or via headphones, and to record their spoken responses. The test begins with three simple, unmarked warm-up questions and then proceeds with through five sections:

- Part 1 – Presentation: respond to a topic with three bullet points (response time: ~1 minute)
- Part 2.1 – Summary: listen to an audio extract of a tutorial (Linguaskill) or meeting (Linguaskill Business) in which four key points are given; summarise the four key points for a classmate or colleague who was unable to attend (response time: 40 seconds)
- Part 2.2 – Discussion questions: listen to and give opinions in answer to three follow-up questions from the same classmate/colleague about the same topic
- Part 3 – Recommendation: read a friend's (Linguaskill) or colleague's (Linguaskill Business) requirements in a text message format and supplementary information; make a recommendation to meet the friend's/colleague's requirements
- Part 4 – Argument presentation and evaluation: consider arguments both for and against a statement, reaching a conclusion and providing reasons to support the final argument

The Speaking module lasts 16 minutes.

== Timing and results ==
The scheduling and pricing of Linguaskill tests is determined by the local testing centres where the tests are offered. Additionally, organisations such as schools, universities, and companies can offer the test on site for their students or employees.

The Reading and Listening modules are scored automatically by computer. Writing answers are marked by human examiners, and speaking responses are assessed by human examiners and artificial intelligence (hybrid marking).

Results are presented as a digital certificate for candidates. Group reports are also available for organisations to view results of group cohorts of candidates. The timeline for delivery of results depends on how the test is taken (in-centre or remote) and the volume of candidates in the session, with scores made available within 3–15 days.

The certificate has the following information about the candidate's performance:

- a CEFR level for each skill tested (Reading, Listening, Writing, Speaking)
- a score on the Cambridge English Scale for each skill tested (Reading, Listening, Writing, Speaking)
- an average CEFR score (if more than one skill is tested)
- an average Cambridge English Scale score (if more than one skill is tested)
- an explanation of what each score means in terms of English language ability.

The following scores are used to report results:

Cambridge English Scale score	CEFR Level
200–210	C2
180–199	C1
160–179	B2
140–159	B1

A score below B1 level for any module will not be reported and the module will not be shown on the certificate.

Linguaskill certificates do not have an expiry date. However, organisations that accept Linguaskill can choose how recently the test must have been taken for their own admissions or recruitment policies.

== Usage ==
Linguaskill is primarily used by organisations for their own internal purposes, although it is more widely accepted for recruitment in Asia. It is not as widely accepted for university admissions as other more prominent exams, such as IELTS or TOEFL.

== Preparation ==
A range of preparation materials, such as sample tests, support videos, and lesson plans, are provided for free for both variants of the test. Paid resources, including an online tutor, textbooks, and practice tests are available from Cambridge University Press and other publishers. Typically, any general English course will prepare a candidate sufficiently for the Linguaskill exam; those following a general course are recommended to supplement their studies with practice tests in order to learn the exam format.

== See also ==
- Cambridge Assessment English
