= Discover English =

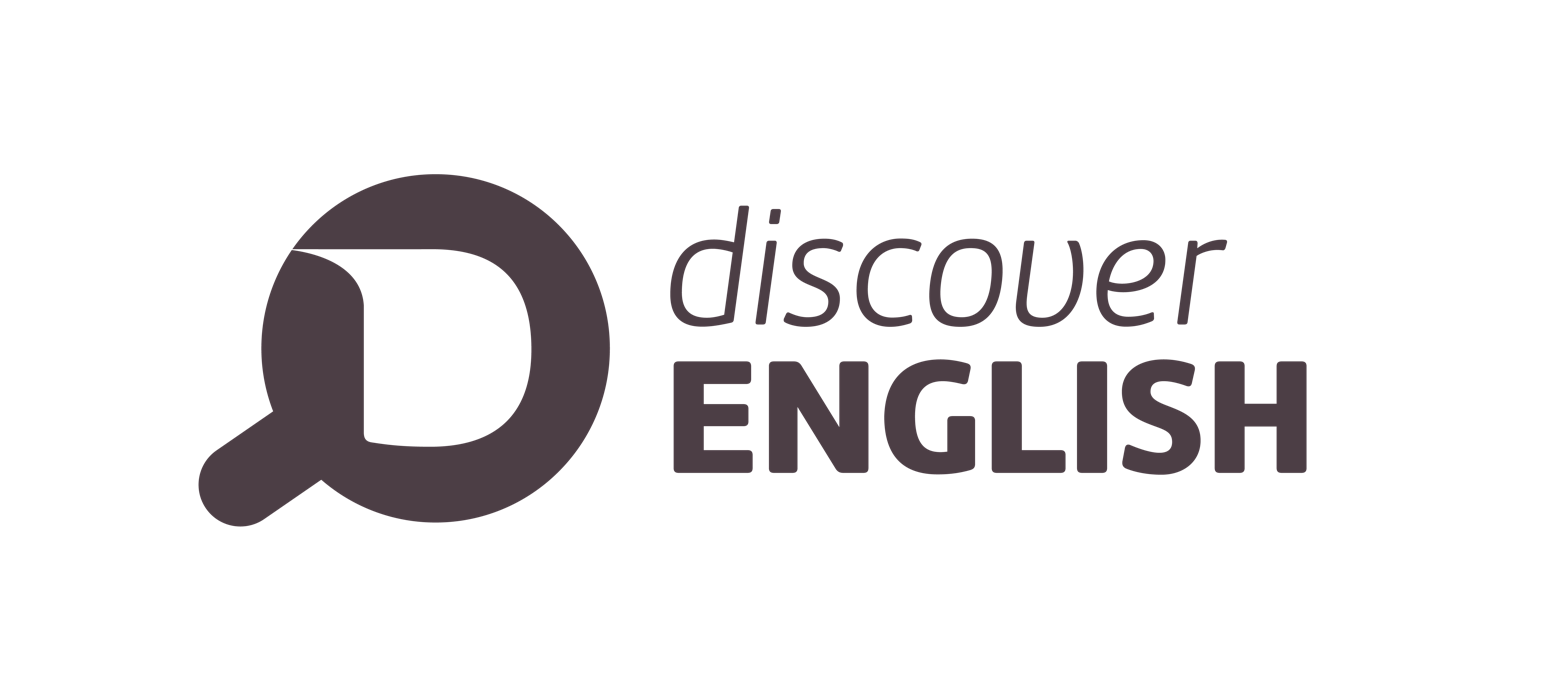
- Industry: Education
- Founded: 2010
- Headquarters: Melbourne, Victoria
- Parent: Academies Australasia
- Divisions: Test Preparation, English Education

Discover English is an English language college located in Melbourne, Victoria, Australia. Discover English offers general and specialised courses including General English, English for IELTS and Academic Purposes, and Cambridge ESOL Preparation. The college also operates as an exam centre for the Occupational English Test (OET), LanguageCert and Cambridge exams.

Discover English was founded in 2010 by five educational professionals who wanted to establish an ESL college.

Discover English is located at Level 7, 628 Bourke Street, Melbourne, Victoria. The location is in the heart of Melbourne's central business district and offers students multiple floors of modern facilities, including full Wi-Fi access and software for Computer Assisted Language Learning (CALL).
