= Studies in Language Testing =

Academic book series

- Edited by: Lynda Taylor; Nick Saville
- Language: English
- Discipline: Applied linguistics, education
- Publisher: Cambridge English Language Assessment and Cambridge University Press
- Published: 1995–present
- Media type: Print
- No. of books: 54
- OCLC: 611149081
- Website: www.cambridgeenglish.org/english-research-group/published-research/silt/

Studies in Language Testing (SiLT) is a series of academic books containing papers in the fields of education and applied linguistics related to language testing and assessment.

It has been published by Cambridge English Language Assessment and Cambridge University Press and Cambridge English Language Assessment since 1995. The series editors are Lynda Taylor and Nick Saville.

Although each volume has a variety of purposes, 10 broad themes characterize the series:

- language testing terminology
- language testing research methodology
- test taker characteristics and language test performance
- testing the four language skills
- testing English for Academic Purposes: IELTS
- test impact/washback
- test comparability
- test documenting
- conference proceedings.

== See also ==
- Association of Language Testers in Europe
- Cambridge English Language Assessment
- Cambridge University Press
- Common European Framework of Reference
