= Horacio Franco =

Mexican flautist and recorder player

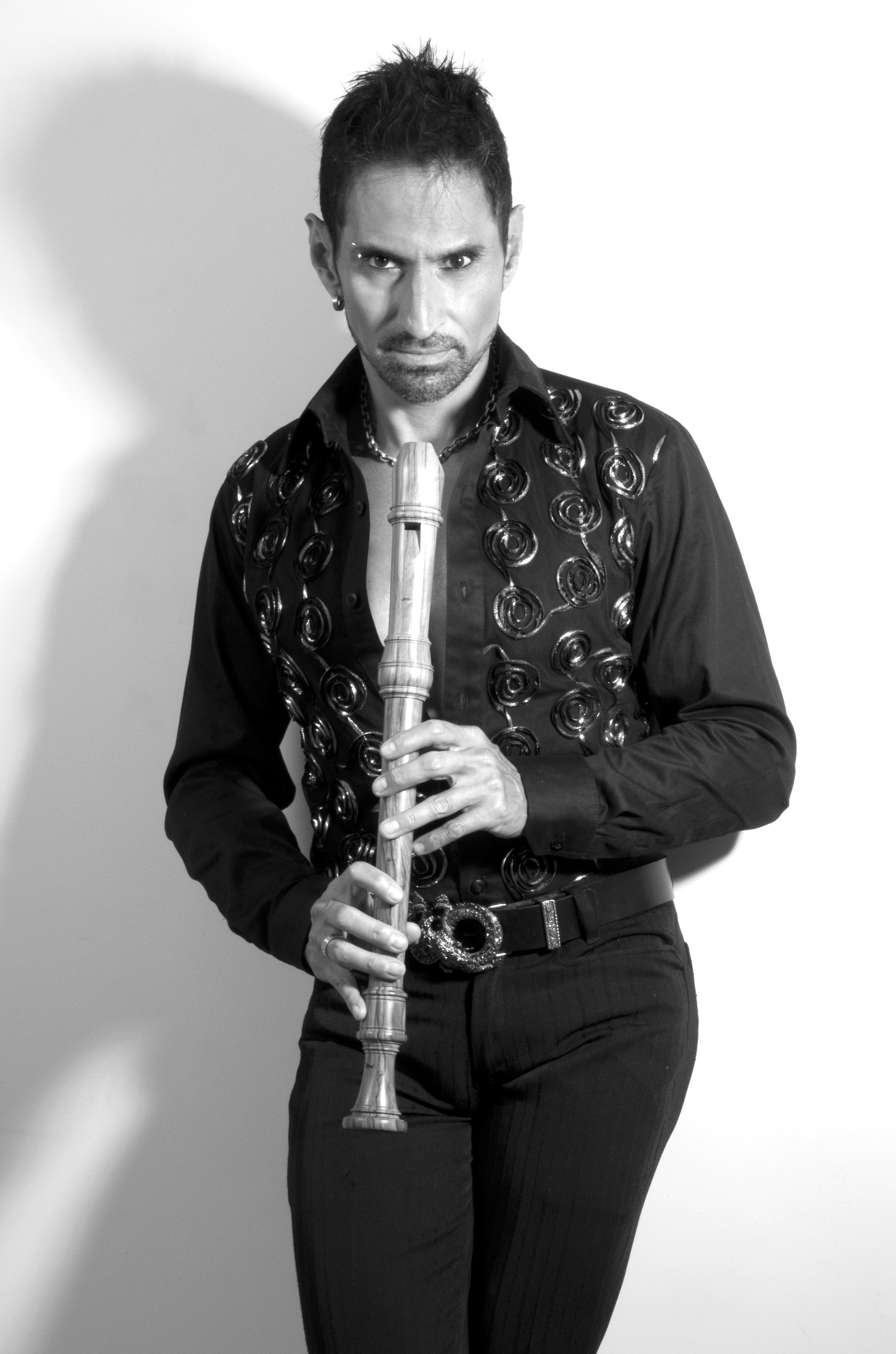
- Franco in 2015

Background information
- Born: 11 October 1963 (age 61)
- Origin: Mexico City, Mexico
- Occupations: Recorder player, conductor
- Instruments: Recorder, block flute
- Years active: 1986–present
- Website: horaciofranco.com

Horacio Franco (born October 11, 1963) is a Mexican flautist and recorder player. Franco has performed many genres of music, from medieval, Renaissance, and Baroque music—including Latin American colonial music—to contemporary, folkloric, and popular styles.

== Personal life ==
Franco is openly a part of the LGBT community, and in 2011, he married Arturo Plancarte, who is his current manager. In March 2020, Franco announced that he had tested positive for COVID-19 amidst the coronavirus pandemic.

== Recordings ==
- Hotteterre Trio, 1987, Luzam Discs
- Solistas of Mexico, director Eduardo Bush, 1988
- Mexican Music for recorder, 1991, Cenidim-Quindecim recordings
- The Folias Hotteterre Trio, 1992, Peer to them discs
- Cappella Cervantina Horacio Franco, director, 1994, Quindecim Recordings
- Vivaldi Concerti per Flauto Horacio Franco and Capella Cervantina, 1994, Quindecim Recordings
- Contemporary Music of Camera, vol. 6, Jorge Cordova, 1994, Bartok Study
- Concerto For Recorder and Orchestra Kibbutzim Chamber Orchestra Mordechai Rechtmann- conductor Michael recorded Wolpe-composer live, 1995, Production of the Composer
- Mexican Symphonic Music Concert for Recorder and Orchestra of Marcela Rodriguez OFUNAM director Ronald Zollman, 1995, Digital Urtext Classics
- Il Gardellino Horacio Franco and the Camerana Aguascalientes, 1996, Quindecim Recordings
- Musica Barroca Mexicana Cappella Cervantina Horacio Franco, director, 1996, Quindecim Recordings
- The Art of Horacio Franco Horacio Franco & the Georgian Chamber Orchestra, directed by Horacio Franco, 1997, Guild Recordings
- Carlos Monsiváis and Horacio Franco, 1997, alive Voice of Mexico, UNAM
- Musica Barroca Mexicana Vol. 2. Cappella Cervantina-Horacio Franco, director, 1998, Discs K 617-France, distributed in Mexico by Quindecim Recordings
- From the Medieval to the Danzón Horacio Franco and Victor Flores, 2002, Quindecim Recordings
- Solo Bach Horacio Franco, 2004, Quindecim Recordings
- Sones de Tierra and Nube with the Band Filarmónica Mixe of the CECAM of Sta. Maria de Tlahuitoltepec, 2005, Xquenda Discs
- Capella Puebla director and soloist Horacio Franco, 2005, Quindecim recordings
- From Bach, the Beatles and others Horacio Franco and Victor Flores, 2005, Quindecim Recordings
