= Business Language Testing Service =

The Business Language Testing Service (BULATS) was an English language test provided by Cambridge English Language Assessment. It has been officially retired on 6 December 2019. It assesses the level of a person in a used language and in a professional context. This foreign language skills assessment is validated by a two-years valid certificate. The languages evaluated are English, German (in collaboration with the Goethe-Institut), Spanish (in collaboration with the University of Salamanca) and French (in collaboration with the Alliance Française).

It's an online test that gives a score between 0 and 100, giving a direct equivalence with the Common European Framework of Reference for Languages levels.

BULATS score	Level description	CEFR level
90–100	Upper advanced	C2
75–89	Advanced	C1
60–74	Upper intermediate	B2
40–59	Intermediate	B1
20–39	Elementary	A2
10–19	Beginner	A1
