= Association of Language Testers in Europe =

Trade association

The Association of Language Testers in Europe (ALTE) is an association of language exam providers in Europe.

The ALTE "Can Do" project developed a simplified set of 400+ descriptors for language examinations which relate to the Common Reference Levels. These descriptors are in the form of "can-do statements", each saying more simply what a learner can do at every level. There are four sections: general, social/ tourist, work and study. The ALTE project also gave its own names to the CEFR levels from the "Breakthrough level" to "Level 5".

The ALTE was founded by the University of Cambridge in conjunction with the University of Salamanca so the first exams to be related to their "Can-Do" statements were the Cambridge EFL exams. However, today many more examining boards link their exams to the system. Below is a table of some examinations as an example.

ALTE now establishes a six-level framework of language examination standards.

The following table compares the ALTE levels with the CEFR levels and EFL exams:

| ALTE level | CEFR level | ESOL exam | IELTS exam | TOEIC | TOEFL iBT |
| Level 5 | C2 | CPE | 7.5+ | — | — |
| Level 4 | C1 | CAE | 6.5–7 | 945+ | 95+ |
| Level 3 | B2 | FCE | 5–6 | 785+ | 72+ |
| Level 2 | B1 | PET | 3.5–4.5 | 550+ | 42+ |
| Level 1 | A2 | KET | 3 | 225+ | — |
| Breakthrough | A1 | — | 1–2 | 120+ | — |

== Levels ==
The Common European Framework divides learners into three broad divisions which can be divided into six levels:

A Basic User

A1 Breakthrough
A2 Waystage

B Independent User

B1 Threshold
B2 Vantage

C Proficient User

C1 Effective Operational Proficiency
C2 Mastery

The CEFR describes what a learner is supposed to be able to do in reading, listening, speaking and writing at each level, in details:

| level | description |
|---|---|
| A1 | Can understand and use familiar everyday expressions and very basic phrases aimed at the satisfaction of needs of a concrete type. Can introduce him/herself and others and can ask and answer questions about personal details such as where he/she lives, people he/she knows and things he/she has. Can interact in a simple way provided the other person talks slowly and clearly and is prepared to help. |
| A2 | Can understand sentences and frequently used expressions related to areas of most immediate relevance (e.g. very basic personal and family information, shopping, local geography, employment). Can communicate in simple and routine tasks requiring a simple and direct exchange of information on familiar and routine matters. Can describe in simple terms aspects of his/her background, immediate environment and matters in areas of immediate need. |
| B1 | Can understand the main points of clear standard input on familiar matters regularly encountered in work, school, leisure, etc. Can deal with most situations likely to arise whilst travelling in an area where the language is spoken. Can produce simple connected text on topics which are familiar or of personal interest. Can describe experiences and events, dreams, hopes & ambitions and briefly give reasons and explanations for opinions and plans. |
| B2 | Can understand the main ideas of complex text on both concrete and abstract topics, including technical discussions in his/her field of specialisation. Can interact with a degree of fluency and spontaneity that makes regular interaction with native speakers quite possible without strain for either party. Can produce clear, detailed text on a wide range of subjects and explain a viewpoint on a topical issue giving the advantages and disadvantages of various options. |
| C1 | Can understand a wide range of demanding, longer texts, and recognise implicit meaning. Can express him/herself fluently and spontaneously without much obvious searching for expressions. Can use language flexibly and effectively for social, academic and professional purposes. Can produce clear, well-structured, detailed text on complex subjects, showing controlled use of organisational patterns, connectors and cohesive devices. |
| C2 | Can understand with ease virtually everything heard or read. Can summarise information from different spoken and written sources, reconstructing arguments and accounts in a coherent presentation. Can express him/herself spontaneously, very fluently and precisely, differentiating finer shades of meaning even in more complex situations. |

== Conferences ==
ALTE aims to improve language assessment through sharing best practice and providing thought leadership through international conferences.

International conference themes have included supporting the European Year of Languages (2001), the impact of multilingualism (2005), the wider social and educational impact of assessment (2008) and the role of language frameworks (2011). Selected conference papers are published through the Studies in Language Testing (SiLT) volumes.

== See also ==
- Common European Framework of Reference for Languages
- Cambridge English Language Assessment
- Studies in Language Testing (SiLT)
