= Cambridge English Scale =

The Cambridge English Scale is a single range of scores used to report results for Cambridge English Language Assessment exams. It was introduced in January 2015, with Cambridge English Scale scores replacing the standardised score and candidate profile used for exams taken pre-2015. The scale aims to provide exam users with more detailed information about their exam performance than was previously available.

From January 2015, results for B2 First, B2 First for schools, C1 Advanced and C2 Proficiency began reporting on the scale. From February 2016 A2 Key for schools and A2 Key for Schools, B1 Preliminary and B1 Preliminary for Schools and Cambridge English: Business Certificates (BEC) have reported on the scale. IELTS is mapped to the Cambridge English Scale but will continue to use its existing nine-band scale for reporting results.

== History ==
The Cambridge English Scale was developed in response to feedback from exam users, including learners, teachers, universities and immigration departments. It builds on previous ways of reporting results and is based on years of research. It is designed to complement the Common European Framework of Reference for Languages (CEFR), building on Cambridge English Language Assessment’s longstanding role in the development of the CEFR and the well-established links between Cambridge English exams and the CEFR.

== How are results reported ==
Successful candidates receive a Statement of Results and a Certificate. The Statement of Results can also be accessed on the online Results Verification Service, which allows recognising organisations to securely verify results. Both the Statement of Results and the Certificate provide the following:

- A score on the Cambridge English Scale for each skill (Reading, Writing, Listening and Speaking) and for Use of English, for the exams in which it is tested. For Cambridge English A2 Key and A2 Key for Schools, a score is reported for each of the three test papers (Reading and Writing, Listening and Speaking).
- A score on the Cambridge English Scale for the overall exam
- A grade for the overall exam
- CEFR level for the overall exam.

The certificate also contains the UK National Qualifications Framework (NQF) level.

The candidate’s overall score is averaged from the individual scores for each skill (Reading, Writing, Listening and Speaking) and for Use of English (when tested). For A2 Key and A2 Key for Schools, the score for the Reading and Writing paper is double-weighted as it tests two skills.

Cambridge English Scale scores replace the candidate profile and standardised scores used for pre-2015 results, but candidates continue to receive a CEFR level and grade.

== The scores for each exam ==
Each Cambridge English exam maps to a particular section of the scale.

The grades and CEFR levels are set at specific points on the Cambridge English Scale. For example, in C1 Advanced, a Cambridge English Scale score of 195 represents a grade B and indicates that the candidate is at CEFR Level C1, whereas a Cambridge English Scale score of 205 represents a grade A and indicates that the candidate is at CEFR Level C2.

Although each Cambridge English exam targets a specific level (e.g. Cambridge English C1 Advanced at Level C1) there is some overlap between exams at adjacent levels. The Cambridge English Scale helps users understand where there is overlap and how performance on one exam relates to performance on another.

The same Cambridge English Scale score represents the same level of proficiency, no matter which exam is taken. However, a higher-level exam covers a broader construct (the cognitive processes and functions in the exam) than a lower-level exam. Therefore, even with equivalent scores, there can be more confidence in the higher-level exam candidate’s ability to perform higher-level cognitive processes and functions. This can be important in contexts where particular functions are needed, for example studying within higher education and in such contexts both the score and the exam on which the score was achieved should be considered.

== Usage ==
The Cambridge English Scale was developed to provide exam users with more detailed information. This information can be used in the following ways:

- Easier for learners and teachers to identify areas for improvement. The new Statement of Results and Certificate show what the learner has achieved in each of the different skills (Reading, Writing, Listening, Speaking and Use Of English) and how their performance in one skill compares to their performance in another. This will benefit the learner’s personal development and help schools that use external assessment.
- Greater insight into learner progression. Results across most Cambridge English exams are reported on the same common scale, making it easier to see how performance on one exam relates to performance on another. Learners who take two or more exams in succession will be able to understand how their level of English in each of the different skills is improving from one exam to the next.
- Easier for institutions to set admissions requirements. It is possible for organisations, such as universities, employers, professional bodies and immigration authorities, to state a requirement for a particular overall score, plus minimum scores for Speaking, Writing, Listening, Reading and Use of English. This could help organisations with decisions about individual candidates, particularly when the organisation wants to focus on specific language skills. It is also easier to compare performances, as all Cambridge English exams report on the same scale and are aligned to the Common European Framework of Reference for Languages (CEFR) and IELTS. With all exams using the same scale, it is also quicker and easier to describe the level of language skills needed.

The Cambridge English Scale is aligned with the CEFR, but can be used in slightly different ways. The CEFR is a broad reference scale whereas the Cambridge English Scale is a more detailed scale, which may be useful for the practical purposes described above, such as identifying a learner’s areas for improvement, stating the precise level of language skills needed for higher education or employment and providing comparability of results.

Institutions updating their entry requirements to include Cambridge English Scale scores include the London School of Economics (LSE), University of Bristol, University of Oxford and University of York. The Australian Department for Immigration and Border Protection (DIBP) has confirmed that from January 2015 it is accepting scores on the Cambridge English Scale achieved in C1 Advanced across its range of visa programmes.

== Implementation ==
From January 2015, the scale was introduced to report results for B2 First, B2 First for Schools, C1 Advanced and C2 Proficiency. From February 2016, the scale was introduced to report results for A2 Key and A2 Key for Schools, B1 Preliminary and B1 Preliminary for Schools and Cambridge English: Business Certificates (BEC).

IELTS is mapped to the Cambridge English Scale but will continue to use its existing nine-band scale for reporting results.

Candidates can use the Cambridge English Scale Score Converter to find out how Cambridge English Scale scores compare to IELTS band scores. The converter can also be used to know how a CEFR level or result from an exam taken before 2015 compares to a Cambridge English Scale score.

== Research and development methodology ==
The Cambridge English Scale was developed using researched links between candidate performance on different Cambridge English tests (using data from millions of candidates) and according to established processes which define and maintain standards for each skill component.

Writing and Speaking components: the assessment criteria for each level are the same across all Cambridge English exams. For example: the criteria required to meet CEFR Level B2 are identical for B2 First and C1 Advanced. Although the raw marks across the two tests are different, equivalent candidates will be awarded the same Cambridge English Scale score.

Reading, Listening and Use of English components: Rasch analysis is used to ensure that a consistent standard is applied in the grading of objectively marked components, accounting for differences in difficulty between them. This is achieved by calibrating the difficulty of all the items in a given test onto the same scale. The scales used for each test are linked to adjacent levels, meaning that standards can be compared and linked across levels and linked to CEFR thresholds.

Test alignment is an ongoing process. Cambridge English Language Assessment has ongoing alignment studies to evaluate and validate the links between adjacent exams and ensure the integrity of the Cambridge English Scale across all Cambridge English exams. In addition, there are ongoing empirical validation studies to establish the alignment to IELTS.

== See also ==
- Cambridge English Language Assessment
- Cambridge English: Key (KET)
- Cambridge English: Preliminary (PET)
- Cambridge English: First (FCE)
- Cambridge English: First for Schools (FCE)
- Cambridge English: Advanced (CAE)
- Cambridge English: Proficiency (CPE)
