= Occupational English Test =

English language proficiency test for healthcare workers

The Occupational English Test (short OET) is an English language test, designed test to assesses the English language proficiency of international healthcare professionals seeking to work in an English-speaking environment.

== History ==
The OET was designed in the late 1980s by Professor Tim McNamara, under the guidance of the Australian National Office for Overseas Skills Recognition (NOOSR), which administered the test at that time. In the following years, the test has been updated by the University of Melbourne's Language Testing Research Centre and by Cambridge Assessment English.

Since March 2013 the test is run by Cambridge Assessment English and Box Hill Institute.

== Conduct ==
The test is broken down into four areas: speaking, listening, reading and writing. The written parts take roughly three hours to complete. The results resemble school grades and range from A (very high level) to E (low level).
