= C2 Proficiency =

English language examination provided by Cambridge Assessment English

C2 Proficiency, previously known as Cambridge English: Proficiency and the Certificate of Proficiency in English (CPE), is an English language examination provided by Cambridge Assessment English (previously known as Cambridge English Language Assessment and University of Cambridge ESOL examination).

C2 Proficiency is the highest level qualification provided by Cambridge Assessment English and shows that learners have mastered English to an exceptional level. It is focused on Level C2 of the Common European Framework of Reference for Languages (CEFR).

C2 Proficiency is one of the examinations in Cambridge English Qualifications – a path for improving language skills. Each Cambridge English Qualification targets a particular level of the CEFR and they work together to create an effective learning journey.

People who were awarded the C2 Proficiency certificate were legally allowed to teach in exchange for money. Namely, this certificate gave people the option to become instructors in Private Course Institutions. It was even possible to acquire a teaching job at a middle school or an elementary school.

In recent years, since the University of Cambridge collaborated with the University of Michigan and re-established the former English Language Institute Testing and Certification Division at the University of Michigan (now called CaMLA), the C2 Proficiency examination (ECPE) can be provided by the University of Michigan as well. Furthermore, the certificate earned from this exam is equivalent to its Cambridge counterpart.

== History ==
C2 Proficiency (previously known as the Certificate of Proficiency in English (CPE) and Cambridge English: Proficiency) was first introduced in 1913 ‘for Foreign Students who desire a satisfactory proof of their knowledge of the language with a view to teaching it in foreign schools.’

The exam took 12 hours and cost £3 (approximately £293 in 2012 prices) and was open only for candidates aged 20 or over. The exam was divided into two sections: written and oral.

Written

1. Translation from English into French or German (2 hours)
2. Translation from French or German into English, and questions on English Grammar (2 1/2 hours)
3. English Essay (2 hours)
4. English Literature (3 hours)
5. English Phonetics (1 1/2 hours)

Oral

1. Dictation (1/2 hour)
2. Reading and Conversation (1/2 hour).

In 1913, the English Essay topics were very Anglocentric:

1. The effect of political movements upon nineteenth century literature in England.
2. English Pre-Raphaelitism
3. Elizabethan travel and discovery
4. The Indian Mutiny
5. The development of local self-government
6. Matthew Arnold.

The first exam in 1913 was taken by just three candidates, who all failed. For the next 15 years the Certificate of Proficiency in English ‘teetered along with 14 or 15 candidates a year.’ By 1929 it was in danger of being discontinued and UCLES decided to introduce some changes to the exam.

By 1926 the length of the exam had been reduced to 11 hours and the translation paper included Italian and Spanish options. In 1930 a special literature paper for foreign students was provided for the first time. The 1930 essay topics were more general and suitable for a variety of candidates:

1. The topic that is most discussed in your country at the present time.
2. Fascism
3. The best month in the year
4. Good companions
5. Any English writer of the twentieth century.
6. Does satire ever effect its purpose, or do any good?

In 1932 the phonetics element of the exam was dropped and the target candidature was widened beyond that of prospective teachers to all ‘foreign students who desired to obtain evidence of their practical knowledge of the language both written and spoken, and of their ability to read with comprehension standard works of English literature.’

Candidature began to rise, from 66 candidates in 1933 to 752 candidates in 1939. Furthermore, the University of Cambridge and University of Oxford began accepting the Certificate of Proficiency in English as the standard of English required of all students.

Another new syllabus for the exam was introduced in 1945, with literature and translation equally weighted. Further changes took place in 1953, when the length of the exam was further reduced to 9 hours and candidates could choose to take a ‘Use of English’ paper as an alternative to ‘Translation’. Use of English questions remain to this day, although in a changed format.

The early 1960s saw the beginnings of a shift in the Cambridge language testing methodology towards a separation of language testing from the testing of literary or cultural knowledge. In 1966, a new syllabus was proposed which reflected a new emphasis on language-based assessment. The structure of the 1966 Certificate of Proficiency in English exam was as follows:

Written

Candidates must offer (a) English Language and two other papers chosen from (b), (c), or (d). No candidate may offer more than one of the alternatives in (b).

a. English Language (composition and a passage or passages of English with language questions. The choice of subjects set for composition will include some for candidates who are specially interested in commerce.) (3 hours)

b. Either English Literature or Science Texts or British Life and Institutions or Survey of Industry and Commerce (3 hours)

c. Use of English (3 hours)

d. Translation from and into English (3 hours)

Oral

a. Dictation, Reading and Conversation.

The exam continued to evolve, reflecting thinking and developments in communicative language assessment and second language acquisition (SLA). By 1975 it included separate listening and speaking tests, finally adopting a format familiar to modern-day candidates with papers in Reading, Use of English, Writing, Listening and Speaking/Interview. In 1984, exam time was reduced to less than 6 hours – half the amount of the original 1913 exam.

Revisions in 2002 continued to reflect developments in communicative language assessment, as first evidenced in the 1975 and 1984 revisions. A paired speaking test was introduced following research into the relative effectiveness of a test with a single candidate or a pair of candidates, with the latter shown to produce a wider range of functional language use. The exam also introduced wider ranges of: sources in reading and text-based tasks, tasks in the writing paper and real-life contexts in the listening paper.

In 2013, C2 Proficiency celebrated its 100th anniversary and another set of revisions was introduced, which aimed at ensuring its continued suitability for higher education study and career enhancement purposes. The Use of English paper was subsumed into the Reading paper and the revised exam is now 4 hours in length.

== Format ==
C2 Proficiency is made up of four exam papers, which cover all the key language skills (Reading and Use of English, Writing, Listening and Speaking).

The Speaking paper is taken face-to-face. Candidates have the choice of taking the Reading and Use of English paper, Writing paper and Listening paper on either a computer or on paper.

1. Reading and Use of English (1 hour 30 minutes – 40% of total marks)

The Reading and Use of English paper has seven parts.

Candidates are expected to be able to read and understand a range of different texts, e.g. fiction and non-fiction books, journals, newspapers and manuals. Candidates are expected to demonstrate a variety of reading skills including skimming, detailed reading, following an argument, coherence and linking, and looking for specific information.

Part 1 requires candidates to complete eight gaps in a text by selecting the correct word or phrase from choice of four options. There is also one example at the beginning. It focuses on vocabulary, grammar, set phrases and contextual understanding.

Parts 2 to 4 focus on Use of English and test underlying knowledge of vocabulary and grammar through exercises such as supplying missing words, forming new words in a given text, and rewriting sentences.

Parts 5 to 7 focus on Reading and test understanding of texts through tasks such as multiple-choice, gapped paragraph and multiple matching exercises.

2. Writing (1 hour 30 minutes – 20% of total marks)

The Writing paper has two parts.

Part 1 has one compulsory question. Candidates are asked to write an essay of approximately 240–280 words, which summarizes and evaluates the key points contained in two texts of approximately 100 words each.

Part 2 requires candidates to answer one question from a choice of four. Candidates may be asked to write an article, a letter, a report, or a review. Prior to 2023, one of the choices will include writing about a set text announced by Cambridge every year.

Candidates write their responses in 280-320 words. They are assessed on their ability to structure and develop ideas of a given topic, the impression their writing makes on the reader, usage of language and how well the candidate achieves their writing purpose.

3. Listening (approximately 40 minutes – 20% of total marks)

The Listening paper has four parts.

Part 1 has three short, unrelated recordings each lasting approximately 1 minute and six multiple-choice questions to complete.

Part 2 has a monologue lasting 3–4 minutes and nine incomplete sentences. Candidates must fill in the gap in each sentence based on the information in the recording.

Part 3 has a recording with interacting speakers lasting 3–4 minutes and 5 multiple-choice questions to complete.

Part 4 has five short, themed monologues each lasting approximately 35 seconds and two multiple-matching tasks. Each task in this part contains 5 questions.

Recordings come from a range of spoken materials, such as lectures, speeches and interviews, and feature language that a candidate might encounter in work situations, at university or in everyday life. Candidates are expected to demonstrate a wide range of listening skills, such as understanding the gist of an extract, understanding specific information or noting the speakers’ opinions, attitudes or feelings.

4. Speaking (16 minutes – 20% of total marks)

The Speaking paper has three parts, with two candidates paired together. There are two examiners. One examiner acts as both interlocutor and assessor and manages the test by asking questions and setting-up tasks for the candidates. The other acts as assessor only and does not join the conversation.

Part 1 is a short conversation with the examiner. The examiner asks a series of questions which give candidates an opportunity to talk about themselves.

Part 2 is a collaborative task with the other candidate. The examiner gives the candidates spoken instructions and one or more pictures to look at. Each candidate answers a question about the picture(s) and then undertakes a decision-making task with the other candidate.

Part 3 is a long monologue and a group discussion. The examiner gives a candidate a card with a question and some ideas. The candidate must speak for about 2 minutes on their own. When they finish the other candidate is asked to comment and the examiner asks both candidates a question on the topic. This procedure is repeated with the second candidate, then the examiner leads a discussion with both candidates.

Candidates are expected to demonstrate a range of oral skills such as organization of thoughts, negotiation, extended discourse and maintaining a discussion with appropriate pronunciation, intonation and speed of delivery.

== Scoring ==
In January 2015, Cambridge English Scale scores replaced the candidate profile and standardized scores used for pre-2015 results. All candidates (pre- and post-2015) receive a Statement of Results, with those scoring high enough also receiving a certificate.

=== Scoring from January 2015 ===
From 2015, the Statement of Results and the Certificate have the following information about the candidate's performance:

- A score on the Cambridge English Scale for each skill (Reading, Writing, Listening and Speaking) and for Use of English
- A score on the Cambridge English Scale for the overall exam
- A grade (A, B, C, Level C1) for the overall exam
- A CEFR level for the overall exam.

The candidate's overall score is averaged from the individual scores for each skill (Reading, Writing, Listening and Speaking) and for Use of English.

C2 Proficiency is targeted at CEFR Level C2, but also provides reliable assessment at the level below C2 (Level C1).

The following scores are used to report results:

Grade	Cambridge English Scale Score (180–230)	CEFR Level
A	220–230	C2
B	213–219	C2
C	200–212	C2
CEFR Level C1	180–199	C1

Scores between 162 and 179 are also reported on the Statement of Results but candidates will not receive a certificate.

=== Scoring pre-January 2015 ===
Pre-2015, the Statement of Results had the following information, reflecting the total combined score from all the papers:

- A grade (A, B, C, Level C1) for the overall exam
- A score (out of 100) for the overall exam
- A CEFR level for the overall exam.

Grade	Score (total mark out of 100)	CEFR Level
A	80–100	C2
B	75–79	C2
C	60–74	C2
CEFR Level C1	45–59	C1

Pre-2015, the Statement of Results had a Candidate Profile, which showed the candidate's performance on each of the individual papers against the following scale: exceptional, good, borderline and weak.

Pre-2015, candidates who achieved a score of 45 or more (out of 100) received a certificate.

== Timing and results ==
Candidates take the Reading and Use of English, Writing, and Listening papers on the same day. The Speaking paper is often taken a few days before or after the other papers, or on the same day.

Successful candidates (those scoring above 180) receive two documents: a Statement of Results and a certificate. Universities, employers and other organizations may require either or both of these documents as proof of English language skills.

== Usage ==
C2 Proficiency demonstrates language proficiency at Level C2 of the Common European Framework of Reference for Languages (CEFR) and is designed to show that a successful candidate has mastered English to an exceptional level.

Learners use this qualification to study post-graduate courses, lead high-level research projects and academic seminars and communicate effectively at upper managerial and board level in international business.

Employers, universities and government departments around the world accept C2 Proficiency as proof that a successful candidate can study or work at the very highest level of professional and academic life and as an indication of English language ability. Many higher education institutions accept C2 Proficiency for admission purposes. This includes universities based in:

- Australia (e.g., Australian National University)
- Canada (e.g., University of Toronto)
- France (e.g., Institut national du service public)
- Germany (e.g., LMU Munich)
- Hong Kong (e.g. City University of Hong Kong)
- Italy (e.g., Roma Tre University)
- Japan (e.g., University of Tokyo)
- the Netherlands (e.g., Utrecht University)
- Russian Federation (e.g., Plekhanov Russian University of Economics)
- Spain (e.g., Charles III University of Madrid)
- Switzerland (e.g., ETH Zurich)
- the United Kingdom (e.g., University of Cambridge)
- the United States of America (e.g., Harvard University).

C1 Advanced and C2 Proficiency can be used to apply for degree courses (or higher) at almost all UK universities. This is because candidates who need to apply for a visa to study at degree level or above at a Tier 4 Sponsor only need to meet the English language requirements set by the university; they don't need to take a test from the UKVI list of Secure English Language Tests (SELT tests).

== See also ==
- A2 Key
- B1 Preliminary
- B2 First
- C1 Advanced
- Cambridge Assessment English
- Cambridge English Qualifications
