= Cambridge Assessment English =

Department of the University of Cambridge

- Established: 1913
- Type: For profit, but part of a tax-exempt charity
- Legal status: A department of the University of Cambridge
- Headquarters: Cambridge, UK
- Region served: Global
- Key people: Francesca Woodward, CEO
- Parent organization: Cambridge University Press & Assessment
- Subsidiaries: CaMLA; OET; ELiT
- Website: cambridgeenglish.org
- Formerly called: Cambridge English Language Assessment / University of Cambridge ESOL Examinations (Cambridge ESOL) / University of Cambridge Local Examinations Syndicate (UCLES)

Cambridge Assessment English or Cambridge English develops and produces Cambridge English Qualifications and the International English Language Testing System (IELTS). The organisation contributed to the development of the Common European Framework of Reference for Languages (CEFR), the standard used around the world to benchmark language skills, and its qualifications and tests are aligned with CEFR levels.

Cambridge Assessment English is part of Cambridge Assessment, a non-teaching department of the University of Cambridge which merged with Cambridge University Press to form Cambridge University Press & Assessment in August 2021.

== Current Cambridge English qualifications/exams ==

Each Cambridge English Qualifications focuses on a level of the Common European Framework of Reference (CEFR).

=== Schools ===
These English qualifications are to help school-age children and young people improve their English language skills.

Exams
Pre A1 Starters
A1 Movers
A2 Flyers
A2 Key for Schools
B1 Preliminary for Schools
B2 First for Schools
C1 Advanced
C2 Proficiency

=== General and higher education ===
These qualifications are designed for adult learners. A2 Key, B1 Preliminary and B2 First have the same exam format (e.g. number of papers, number of questions, time allowance) as the schools' versions of these qualifications, but use different topics and content suited to adult learners.

Exams
A2 Key
B1 Preliminary
B2 First
C1 Advanced
C2 Proficiency

=== Business ===
These qualifications are designed for adult learners learning English for use in a business context.

Exams
B1 Business Preliminary
B2 Business Vantage
C1 Business Higher

=== Multilevel tests ===
Multilevel tests are used to find out which English learning programme or exam is right for a student. These cover multiple levels of the CEFR in one test.

Tests	CEFR level
Cambridge English Placement Test	A1-C2
Cambridge English Placement Test for Young Learners	Pre A1-A2
Linguaskill	B1-C2
IELTS	A1-C2

Cambridge Exams Publishing, a joint venture with Cambridge University Press, produces Cambridge-branded IELTS resources and materials to help learners prepare and practise for their tests.

=== Teaching ===
Qualifications and courses for teachers of all levels of experience.

Exams	Teaching level on the Cambridge English Teaching Framework	Course delivery
CELTA (Certificate in Teaching English to Speakers of Other Languages)	Foundation/Developing	Full-time/part-time. Face-to-face course or online course with face-to-face teaching practice.
CELT-P (Certificate in English Language Teaching – Primary)	Foundation/Developing	Online modular course with optional face-to-face elements. Assessed through an exam and teaching practice.
CELT-S (Certificate in English Language Teaching – Secondary)	Foundation/Developing	Online modular course with optional face-to-face elements. Assessed through an exam and teaching practice.
Language for Teaching	Foundation/Developing/Proficient	Online learning with optional face-to-face elements.
TKT (Teaching Knowledge Test)	Foundation/Developing	Exams with a flexible modular format.
ICELT (In-service Certificate in English Language Teaching)	Developing/Proficient	Part-time face-to-face course with teaching practice and distance learning support.
Delta (Diploma in Teaching English to Speakers of Other Languages)	Proficient/Expert	Flexible modular format combining coursework and exams. Distance learning support, local tutoring and assessed teaching practice.
Certificate in EMI Skills (English as a medium of instruction in Higher Education)	Proficient/Expert	Online learning with optional face-to-face sessions.
Train the Trainer	Proficient/Expert	Part-time face-to-face course.

== Discontinued exams ==
In alphabetical order:

- BULATS discontinued on 6 December 2019.
- Cambridge English: Financial (ICFE) discontinued in December 2016.
- Cambridge English: Legal (ILEC) discontinued in December 2016.
- CELS (Certificates in English Language Skills) modular qualifications for English language learners.
- Certificates in ESOL Skills for Life (SfL) (UK only) discontinued in June 2017.
- DTE(E)LLS (Diploma in Teaching English (ESOL) in the Lifelong Learning Sector) and ADTE(E)LLS (Additional Diploma in Teaching English (ESOL) in the Lifelong Learning Sector): these qualifications for English language teachers in the UK were discontinued in September 2012. CELTA is a recommended alternative for those wanting an English teaching qualification for teaching in the UK.
- IDLTM (International Diploma in Language Teaching Management) discontinued in June 2016.
- PTLLS (Preparing to Teach in the Lifelong Learning Sector) discontinued in November 2012.
- Young Learner (YL) Extension to CELTA discontinued in December 2016.
- TKT: KAL and TKT: Practical discontinued in December 2016.

== Partnerships and acquisitions ==
In the 1980s Cambridge Assessment English, the British Council and IDP Education formed the international IELTS partnership which delivers the IELTS tests.

In 2010 Cambridge Assessment English and the English Language Institute Testing and Certificate Division of the University of Michigan agreed to form a not-for-profit collaboration known as CaMLA (Cambridge Michigan Language Assessments). Cambridge Assessment English owns 65% of the venture.

Since 2011 Cambridge Exams Publishing, a partnership between Cambridge Assessment English and the English Language Teaching (ELT) business of Cambridge University Press, develops official Cambridge preparation materials for Cambridge English and IELTS exams.

In 2013 Cambridge Assessment English formed a joint venture with the Box Hill Institute to deliver the Occupational English Test, known as OET.

In 2019 Cambridge Assessment English acquired English Language iTutoring (ELiT), an artificial intelligence developed off technology from the University of Cambridge, to support new English language assessment products.

== Alignment with the Common European Framework of Reference for Languages (CEFR) ==
Cambridge Assessment English was involved in the early development of the Common European Framework of Reference for Languages (CEFR) and all Cambridge English qualifications and tests are aligned with the levels described by the CEFR. Each Cambridge English Qualification targets specific CEFR levels but the exam also contains test material at the adjacent levels. For example, B2 First is aimed at B2, but there are also test items that cover B1 and C1. This allows for inferences to be drawn about candidates' abilities if they are a level below or above the one targeted. Candidates are encouraged to take the exam most suitable to their needs and level of ability.

== Research ==
The Cambridge English EFL Evaluation Unit was established in 1989 and was the first dedicated research unit of its kind. This unit is now called the Research and Validation Group and is the largest dedicated research team of any English language assessment body. Research is published in the Studies in Language Testing (SiLT) series.

== Awards ==
In 2015, Cambridge Assessment English was awarded the Queen's Award for Enterprise in the 'international trade' category.

== Qualification development ==
=== Cambridge University's examination board (UCLES) ===
The first Cambridge English exam was produced in 1913 by UCLES (University of Cambridge Local Examinations Syndicate). UCLES had been set up in 1858 to provide exams to students who were not members of a university.

There was a growing concern in Britain with standards of school education and the transition from secondary to tertiary-level education. A number of schools "petitioned the Universities of Oxford and Cambridge [to provide] means of comparing achievements of pupils across schools." The secondary education sector was still voluntary in nature. Without support from the state, it was logical to seek help from universities that were long established and widely admired. The University of Oxford and University of Cambridge, in particular, were "regarded as viable sources of supervision."

UCLES was invited to set exams and inspect schools with the aim of raising educational standards. The University of Oxford also created its own examination board: the University of Oxford Delegacy of Local Examinations (UODLE). UODLE and its partner, the Association of Recognised English Language Schools, merged with UCLES in 1995.

The first UCLES examinations took place on 14 December 1858. The exams were designed to test for university selection and were taken by 370 candidates in British schools, churches and village halls. Candidates were required to "satisfy the examiners" in the analysis and parsing of a Shakespeare text; reading aloud; dictation; and composition (on either the recently deceased Duke of Wellington; a well-known book or a letter of application).

Female candidates were accepted by UCLES on a trial basis in 1864 and on a permanent basis from 1867. Cambridge University itself did not examine female students until 1882 and it was not until 1948 that women were allowed to graduate as full members of the university.

In the mid to late 19th century, UCLES exams were taken by candidates based overseas – in Trinidad and Tobago (from 1863), South Africa (from 1869), Guyana and New Zealand (from 1874), Jamaica (from 1882) and Malaysia (from 1891). Many of these candidates were children of officers of the British colonial service and exams were not yet designed for non-native speakers of English.

=== The first Cambridge English exam ===
In 1913 UCLES created the first exam for non-native speakers of English – the Certificate of Proficiency in English (CPE – now known as C2 Proficiency). This may have been prompted by the development of English exams "for foreigners" by other universities.

CPE was originally a qualification for teachers: "the Certificate of Proficiency in English is designed for Foreign Students who desire satisfactory proof of their knowledge of the language with a view to teaching it in foreign schools." The exam was only available for candidates aged 20 or over.

In 1913 the exam could be taken in Cambridge or London, for a fee of £3 (approximately £293 in 2012 prices). The exam lasted 12 hours and included:

1. Translation from English into French or German: 2 hours
2. Translation from French or German into English, and English Grammar: 2.5 hours
3. English Essay: 2 hours
4. English Literature: 3 hours
5. English Phonetics: 1.5 hours
6. Oral test: dictation (30 minutes); reading aloud and conversation (30 minutes)

The main influence behind the design of the exam was the grammar-translation teaching approach, which aims to establish reading knowledge (rather than the ability to communicate in the language). In 1913, the first requirement for CPE candidates was to translate texts. Translation remained prominent in foreign language teaching up until the 1960s. It was a core part of CPE until 1975 and an optional part until 1989.

However, CPE was also influenced by Henry Sweet and his book published in 1900: A Practical Study of Languages: A Guide for Teachers and Learners, which argued that "the most natural method of teaching languages was through conversation." Due to this influence, speaking was part of Cambridge English exams from the very beginning.

=== Exam questions in 1913 ===
Candidates were required to translate from English into French/German and translate from French/German into English. Here is a short segment from one of the passages candidates were asked to translate from English into German:

The sentiments which animated Schiller's poetry were converted into principles of conduct; his actions were as blameless as his writings were pure. With his simple and high predilections, with his strong devotedness to a noble cause, he contrived to steer through life, unsullied by its meanness, unsubdued by any of its difficulties or allurements ...

In the English Essay paper, candidates were asked to write an essay for two hours, on one of the following subjects: the effect of political movements upon nineteenth-century literature in England; English Pre-Raphaelitism; Elizabethan travel and discovery; the Indian Mutiny; the development of local self-government; or Matthew Arnold. The exam board provided little or no formal structure. Concepts such as audience and purpose, and the length of the essay, were left for the candidate to decide.

The questions in the English Literature section were borrowed from the university's Language and Literature matriculation exams for native speakers and included questions on Shakespeare's Coriolanus and Milton's Paradise Lost. Here is an example question: explain fully and comment on the following passages, stating the connexions in which they occur and any difficulties of reading, phraseology or allusion: "Wert thou the Hector, That was the whip of your bragg'd progency, Thou should'st not 'scrape me here." It was not until 1930 that a Literature paper was designed specifically for CPE candidates.

The grammar section contained questions about grammar and lexis, e.g. give the past tense and past participle of each of the following verbs, dividing them into strong and weak ..., and questions about grammar and lexis usage, e.g. embody each of the following words into a sentence in such a way as to show that you clearly apprehend its meaning: commence, comment, commend ... At the time, this mirrored the approach to learning grammar in Latin and Greek (as well as modern languages).

Finally, a Phonetics paper was included as it was thought to be useful in the teaching of pronunciation. The paper required candidates to make phonetic transcriptions of long pieces of continuous text; describe the articulation of particular sounds; explain phonetic terms, and suggest ways of teaching certain sounds. Here are two example questions: explain the terms: "glide", "narrow vowel", "semi-vowel" and give two examples of each in both phonetic and ordinary spelling and how would you teach a pupil the correct pronunciation of the vowel sounds in: fare, fate, fat, fall, far?

=== Revisions to the 1913 exam ===
The 1913 CPE exam was taken by just three candidates. The candidates "were able to converse fluently, expressing themselves on the whole, with remarkable ease and accuracy." However, all three candidates failed the exam and none of them was awarded a CPE certificate.

In its second year (1914), CPE gained in popularity, with 18 candidates and four passing. However, for the next 15 years candidature remained static. Italian and Spanish were added as languages for the translation paper in 1926.

In 1928, CPE had only 14 candidates and by 1929 it was in danger of being discontinued. Jack Roach, Assistant Secretary to the Syndicate from 1925 to 1945, decided to "save it from the scrapheap" and introduced a number of changes. The Phonetics paper was dropped and the essay questions became more a test of writing proficiency rather than a test of knowledge about British culture. Questions such as "The best month of the year" were preferred to the more culture-bound topics set in 1913, such as "Elizabethan travel and discovery." The target candidature was broadened beyond teachers, to "all foreign students who desire to obtain evidence of their practical knowledge of the languages, both written and spoken, as of their ability to read with comprehension standard works of English literature."

In 1932 it was decided to establish overseas exam centres. The first overseas centres were set up in Hamburg, Paris and San Remo (1933), followed by further centres in Italy (Rome and Naples), the Netherlands, Sweden and Switzerland. Latin America also became an exam area in the 1930s, with centres in Argentina and Uruguay.

In 1935 CPE started providing alternatives to the Literature paper, with an Economic and Commercial Knowledge paper – an early forerunner of English for Specific Purposes.

Then, in 1937–38, the University of Cambridge and University of Oxford decided to accept CPE as representing the standard in English required of all students, British or foreign, before the entrance to their university. To this day, CPE still serves as a qualification for entry to higher education. Following these changes CPE candidate numbers instantly began to rise, reaching 752 by the outbreak of World War II.

=== World War II ===
From 1939 onwards, thousands of refugees from the Spanish Civil War and occupied Europe started arriving in the UK and began taking UCLES exams while stationed in the UK.

UCLES launched the Lower Certificate in English (LCE) to meet the demand for certification at a lower level than CPE. A Preliminary exam, at a lower level than LCE, was also offered in 1944 as a special test to meet the contingencies of war. These were the first steps toward developing language assessments at different levels.

Polish servicemen and women made up a large proportion of the candidature. In 1943, over a third of all LCE Certificates were awarded to candidates from the Polish army and air force. This pattern continued throughout the war and into the post-war period. On one single day in 1948, no fewer than 2,500 Polish men and women of the Polish Resettlement Corps took the LCE.

UCLES tests were made available for prisoners of war in Britain and in Germany. In Britain, 1,500 prisoners of war took the exams, almost 900 of them Italians. In Germany, the War Organisation of the British Red Cross and Order of St John of Jerusalem made arrangements for UCLES examinations to be offered at prisoner-of-war camps with many Indian prisoners of war, in particular, taking LCE or School Certificate exams.

Examiners were asked to report on "disturbance, loss of sleep, etc., caused by air raids, and on any exceptional difficulties ... during the examination period." One report noted that the candidates had been spending "most of each day in the air-raid shelter"; that candidate 5224, a probationer nurse, had been showing strain caused by helping with "rescue work"; and that the house of candidate 5222 had been bombed, whilst she was at school, with fatalities. Such were the circumstances of wartime exam takers and administrators.

Exams were also maintained clandestinely in continental European exam centres, which frequently meant unusual measures, including acts of determination and courage. However, UCLES was unable to fund and support the growing international network of English language examination centres around the world. Meanwhile, the British Council had a brief to disseminate British culture and educational links. In March 1941 a formal 'Joint Agreement' was signed between the two organisations to collaborate on the distribution of UCLES exams around the world. This started a long-lasting relationship, which continues to this day.

=== Post-war ===
By 1947, there were over 6,000 UCLES candidates, with LCE double the size of CPE. Exam centres had been set up in Europe (17), Latin America (9), the Middle East (8), Africa (4) and the USA (1). Candidate numbers continued to grow, reaching over 20,000 by 1955, 44,000 by 1965, and over 66,000 by 1975.

However, by the 1970s demand was growing for exams at more clearly defined levels of proficiency. This set the scene for the Council of Europe and the development of the Common European Framework of Reference for Languages (CEFR), which was initiated in 1971.

=== Qualification at different levels ===
UCLES had a few attempts at developing language assessments at different levels. During the Second World War, there was a three-level system: the Preliminary English Test, LCE and CPE. After the war, a new three-level system was introduced: LCE, CPE and DES (The Diploma of English Studies). However, as an extremely advanced exam, DES candidature never rose beyond a few hundred and was later discontinued.

In the 1980s and 1990s, the levels stabilised and the suite of exams we recognise today became established. A five-level system was developed, which characterises Cambridge English's general English exams to the present day and laid the foundations for the levels in the CEFR.

- Level 1: the Key English Test (KET) was launched in 1994. It is now known as A2 Key.
- Level 2: the Preliminary English Test (PET) was originally used during the Second World War years. It reappeared in 1980 under close monitoring and was fully launched in the 1990s. It is now known as B1 Preliminary.
- Level 3: LCE, operational since the Second World War, continued under a new name: the First Certificate in English. It is now known as B2 First.
- Level 4: the Certificate in Advanced English (CAE) was launched in 1991. It is now known as C1 Advanced.
- Level 5: CPE, operational since 1913, became Cambridge English's highest level qualification. It is now known as C2 Proficiency.

During this period there were also substantial revisions to the existing exams: B2 First and C2 Proficiency. These revisions included improving the authenticity of texts and tasks; increasing the weight on Listening and Speaking; improving the balance between grammar and vocabulary items in the Reading paper; and adding a broader range of texts in the Composition and Use of English papers, (e.g. letter-writing, dialogues, speeches, note-taking, and discursive and descriptive compositions).

With increased weight on Listening and Speaking, UCLES joined forces with the BBC. However, in the BBC recording booths, there was tension between the BBC's approach, which focused on dramatic potential, and UCLES' need for clarity of speech. For example, a man abseiling down a mountain was highly entertaining but unacceptable for test purposes. It was finally agreed that at least 35% of listening tests would comprise an original BBC recording, largely made up of programmes from World Service and Woman's Hour broadcasts.

=== IELTS ===
With learners increasingly requiring English language certification for their studies, UCLES, along with the British Council and the Australian International Development Programme (IDP), developed a test in the 1980s which focused specifically on English for academic purposes.

An English Language Testing Service (ELTS) test was first launched in 1980 with tasks based on language use in academic and occupational contexts in the "real world". However, the ELTS test was very complex to administer and only two full versions were ever produced.

In 1989, a simplified and shortened test became operational under a new name: the International English Language Testing System (IELTS).

It was clear that different forms of the test would need to be equated. All IELTS materials were therefore pretested and calibrated to a common scale on the basis of the Rasch model. This was the first time that UCLES had used the Rasch model, which now forms the cornerstone of the level testing system.

=== RSA and teaching qualifications ===
In 1988, the EFL exams developed by The Royal Society of Arts (RSA) Examination Board were merged with those of UCLES. The RSA Examination Board had been established in 1754, long before UCLES, and by taking over the RSA TEFL schemes UCLES became responsible for "the running of the world's most respected and widely recognised schemes for validating training courses for teachers of English as a Foreign Language."

The two sets of qualifications were integrated and syllabuses for the revised qualifications were developed in consultation with the ESL sector, in order to re-integrate the ESL and EFL teacher communities. In 1999 the RSA Certificate in Teaching English as a Foreign Language to Adults (CTEFLA) and the RSA Diploma in Teaching English as a Foreign Language to Adults officially became known as the CELTA and DELTA qualifications. These qualifications were joined in 2004 by ICELT (a revised version of its predecessor, COTE) – which is a purely in-service professional qualification.

At the start of the 21st century, there was growing demand from government ministries and schools for a professional qualification without any in-service (teaching practice) component. This led to the introduction of the Teaching Knowledge Test (TKT), which focuses solely on core professional knowledge. Following consultations with worldwide teacher training institutions and trials with 1,500 English language teachers in Europe, Latin America and Asia, TKT went live in 2005. In the first six months thousands of candidates sat the test in 36 different countries. It was also incorporated into government plans, e.g. plans in Chile to retrain all in-service teachers, and was incorporated into state university teacher training programmes.

=== China and Business English ===
The early 1990s saw China developing its market economy very rapidly. Recognising the importance of English as a language of international business and trade, the Chinese government asked Cambridge Assessment English to develop a suite of Business English Certificates (BEC).

BEC Preliminary (now known as B1 Business Preliminary) examinations were first taken in 1993 by 5,000 candidates from seven cities across China. BEC Vantage (now known as B2 Business Vantage) was launched in 1994 and BEC Higher (now known as C1 Business Higher) in 1996. This was followed in 1997 by the launch of the Business Language Testing Service (BULATS) for companies.

=== Young Learners ===
In the 1990s, there was growing demand from Cambridge English centres in the Far East, Latin America and Europe for assessments designed specifically for younger learners. At the time, relatively little research had been carried out into the assessment of second language learning in children.

UCLES worked with Homerton College (a teacher training college within the University of Cambridge) to trial test questions with over 3,000 children in Europe, South America and South East Asia. The feedback was used to construct the first Young Learners English (YLE) tests, targeted at learners aged 6–12, which went live in 1997.

The YLE tests introduced a new level. The addition of the 'breakthrough' level created a six-level system that was mirrored by the CEFR, published in 2001.

=== Candidates ===
In 1988, with just two established exams (B2 First and C2 Proficiency), exam candidature was around 180,000. By 2002, with a more comprehensive range of exams, the exam candidature was over 1 million; by 2007, it was over 2 million, by 2013, it was over 4 million; and by 2017, it was over 5.5 million.

=== The Cambridge English Scale ===
In January 2015, a new way of reporting results was introduced – the Cambridge English Scale. The scale aims to provide exam users with more information about their exam performance.

Candidates get more detailed results – receiving an overall score and a score for each skill/paper. In addition, the Cambridge English Scale makes it easier to see the progression and compare performance across different Cambridge English exams.

B2 First, C1 Advanced and C2 Proficiency have reported results on the Cambridge English Scale since January 2015. A2 Key and A2 Key for Schools, B1 Preliminary and B1 Preliminary for Schools and Business Certificates have reported results on the scale since February 2016.

== Timeline 1209–2021 ==
- 1209: University of Cambridge founded.
- 1534: Cambridge University Press founded.
- 1858: University of Cambridge Local Examinations Syndicate (UCLES) founded.
- 1913: Certificate of Proficiency in English (CPE) introduced. Now known as C2 Proficiency.
- 1939: Lower Certificate in English (LCE) introduced. Renamed First Certificate in English (FCE) in 1975 and now known as B2 First.
- 1941: Joint agreement with the British Council – British Council centres established.
- 1943–1947: Preliminary English Test (PET) introduced. It was reintroduced in 1980 and is now known as B1 Preliminary.
- 1971: Common European Framework of Reference for Languages (CEFR) initiated.
- 1988: The Royal Society of Arts (RSA) Examination Board becomes part of UCLES.
- 1989: Specialist EFL research and evaluation unit established.
- 1989: IELTS launched. A simplified and shortened version named ELTS was launched in 1980.
- 1990: Association of Language Testers in Europe (ALTE) founded.
- 1991: Certificate in Advanced English (CAE) introduced. Now known as C1 Advanced.
- 1993: Business English Certificates (BEC) launched.
- 1994: Key English Test (KET) introduced. Now known as A2 Key.
- 1995: University of Oxford Delegacy of Local Examinations (UODLE) becomes part of UCLES.
- 1997: Young Learners English Tests (YLE) introduced. Now known as Pre-A1 Starters, A1 Movers, and A2 Flyers.
- 1997: BULATS launched.
- 2001: CEFR published.
- 2002: UCLES EFL renamed University of Cambridge ESOL Examinations (Cambridge ESOL).
- 2002: One million Cambridge ESOL exam candidates.
- 2010: CaMLA established (Cambridge Michigan Language Assessments).
- 2011: Cambridge Exams Publishing joint venture with Cambridge University Press established.
- 2013: Cambridge ESOL renamed Cambridge English Language Assessment.
- 2015: Cambridge English Scale introduced.
- 2016: Linguaskill reading and listening introduced.
- 2016: Linguaskill writing introduced.
- 2017: Cambridge English Language Assessment renamed Cambridge Assessment English.
- 2020: The University of Cambridge announces its plans to merge two of its non-teaching departments, Cambridge Assessment and Cambridge University Press.
- 2021: Cambridge Assessment and Cambridge University Press merge to become Cambridge University Press & Assessment

== See also ==
- CaMLA
- IELTS, International English Language Testing System
- Studies in Language Testing (SiLT)
- Teaching English as a Foreign Language
