= C1 Advanced =

English language examination provided by Cambridge Assessment English

C1 Advanced, previously known as Cambridge English: Advanced and the Certificate in Advanced English (CAE), is an English language examination provided by Cambridge Assessment English (previously known as Cambridge English Language Assessment and the University of Cambridge ESOL examination).

C1 Advanced looks to prove high-level achievement in English and is designed for learners preparing for university or professional life. It focuses on Level C1 of the Common European Framework of Reference for Languages (CEFR).

C1 Advanced is one of the examinations in Cambridge English Qualifications. Each Cambridge English Qualification targets a particular level of the CEFR.

== History ==
C1 Advanced was developed in response to feedback from language centres that there was a too great gap between the qualifications now known as B2 First and C2 Proficiency.

C1 Advanced was designed to allow learners to gain certification for advanced levels of English suitable for use in academic and professional life. It was developed using a socio-cognitive approach – that is, it encourages language skills for use in real-life situations.

Following the launch of the exam, the qualification has been continuously updated to reflect changes in language teaching and assessment. The most recent updates took place in 2015. The main differences are: the overall exam is now 45 minutes shorter; there are four exam papers instead of five; the Reading and Use of English papers have been combined into a single paper, and there are some new testing focuses and task types.

== Format ==
C1 Advanced is made up of four exam papers, which cover all the key language skills (Reading and Use of Language, Writing, Listening and Speaking).

The Speaking paper is taken face-to-face. Candidates have the choice of taking the Reading and Use of English paper, Writing paper and Listening paper on either a computer or on paper.

== Scoring ==
In January 2015, Cambridge English Scale scores replaced the candidate profile and standardised scores used for pre-2015 results. All candidates (pre- and post-2015) receive a Statement of Results, with those scoring high enough also receiving a certificate.

=== Scoring from January 2015 ===
From 2015, the Statement of Results and the Certificate have the following information about the candidate’s performance:

- A score on the Cambridge English Scale for each skill (Reading, Writing, Listening and Speaking) and Use of English
- A score on the Cambridge English Scale for the overall exam
- A grade (A, B, C, Level B2) for the overall exam
- A CEFR level for the overall exam.

The certificate also contains the UK National Qualifications Framework (NQF) level.

The candidate’s overall score is averaged from the individual scores for each skill (Reading, Writing, Listening and Speaking) and Use of English.

C1 Advanced is targeted at CEFR Level C1 but also provides reliable assessment at the level above C1 (Level C2) and the level below (B2). The following scores are used to report results:

Grade	Cambridge English Scale Score (160–210)	CEFR Level
A	200–210	C2
B	193–199	C1
C	180–192	C1
CEFR Level B2	160–179	B2

Scores between 142 and 159 are also reported on the Statement of Results but candidates will not receive a certificate.

=== Scoring pre-2015 ===
Pre-2015, the Statement of Results had the following information, reflecting the total combined score from all four papers:

- A grade (A, B, C, Level B2) for the overall exam
- A score (out of 100) for the overall exam
- A CEFR level for the overall exam.

Grade	Score (total mark of 100)	CEFR Level
A	80–100	C2
B	75–79	C1
C	60–74	C1
CEFR Level B2	45–59	B2

Pre-2015, the Statement of Results also had a Candidate Profile, which showed the candidate’s performance on each of the individual papers against the following scale: exceptional, good, borderline and weak.

Pre-2015, candidates who achieved a score of 45 or more (out of 100) received a certificate.

== Timing and results ==
Candidates take the Reading and Use of English, Writing and Listening papers on the same day. The Speaking paper is usually taken a few days before or after the other papers or on the same day.

Successful candidates receive two documents: a Statement of Results and a Certificate. Universities, employers and other organisations may require either of these documents as proof of English language skills.

An online Statement of Results is available to candidates who have sat the computer-based exam two weeks after the exam and to candidates of the paper-based exam approximately four weeks after the exam. Successful candidates (those scoring above 160 on the Cambridge English Scale) will receive a hard copy certificate within three months of the exam.

Holders of a C1 Advanced certificate display similar language ability to candidates who have an IELTS score of 6.5 to 8.0. The following table demonstrates a comparison of Cambridge English Scale scores, as used by C1 Advanced, with IELTS band scores.

Cambridge English Scale scores	IELTS band scores
191	7.5
185	7.0
176	6.5
169	6.0
162	5.5
154	5.0

== Usage ==
C1 Advanced is used for study, work and immigration purposes. It is designed to demonstrate that a candidate has achieved a high level of English ability which can be used in academic and professional contexts.

C1 Advanced is accepted globally by over 6,000 institutions. Many higher education institutions accept C1 Advanced for admission purposes. C1 Advanced and C2 Proficiency can be used to apply for degree courses (or higher) at almost all UK universities, as candidates who need to apply for a visa to study at degree level or above at a Tier 4 Sponsor only need to meet the English language requirements set by the university; they don't need to take a test from the UKVI list of Secure English Language Tests (SELT tests).

In some countries, students with a C1 Advanced certificate gain exemption from the English components of school-leaving exams.

C1 Advanced can be used for visa purposes, with recognition by the Australian Department of Immigration and Border Protection (DIBP, formerly DIAC) for student visas. DIBP has extended the recognition of C1 Advanced and they will now accept scores in the exam for Temporary Graduate, Skilled, Former Resident, and Work and Holiday visa.

C1 Advanced is also recognised by many employers.

Many institutions accept more than one English language exam, e.g. C1 Advanced and IELTS. However, there are some subtle differences between these two exams. For example, C1 Advanced certifies at B2, C1 and C2 levels – the language levels needed for study and work; IELTS is designed to test a much broader range of language levels, from CEFR Level A1 up to C2.

== See also ==
- Cambridge Assessment English
- Cambridge English Qualifications
- A2 Key
- B1 Preliminary
- B2 First
- C2 Proficiency
