= B1 Preliminary =

English language examination provided by Cambridge Assessment English

- Year started: 1943

B1 Preliminary, previously known as Cambridge English: Preliminary and the Preliminary English Test (PET), is an English language examination provided by Cambridge Assessment English, one of the examinations in the Cambridge English Qualifications.

B1 Preliminary is an intermediate-level qualification and is designed for learners who have mastered the basic of English and now have practical language skills for everyday use. It is targeted at Level B1 of the Common European Framework of Reference (CEFR).

B1 Preliminary is offered in two versions: B1 Preliminary for Schools, for school-aged learners, and B1 Preliminary, for general and higher education adult learners.

== History ==
B1 Preliminary was first launched in 1943. It had been created as a special exam to meet the contingencies of the Second World War – catering to foreign servicemen needing English. The exam was discontinued at the end of World War II (1946).

B1 Preliminary was reintroduced in 1980 under close monitoring, and was fully launched in the 1990s. It received updates in 1994. In 1999, it was reviewed with stakeholders and the current version was launched in March 2004.

== B1 Preliminary and B1 Preliminary for Schools ==
B1 Preliminary is available in two versions:

- B1 Preliminary, designed for adult learners. B1 Preliminary is one of the exams that make up Cambridge English Qualifications for general and higher education.
- B1 Preliminary for Schools, designed for school-aged learners. B1 Preliminary for Schools is one of the exams that make up Cambridge English Qualifications for schools.

B1 Preliminary and B1 Preliminary for Schools both have the same exam format (e.g. number of papers, number of questions, time allowance), both support learners to develop real-life communication skills, and both versions lead to the same certificate.

The exams use different topics and content: B1 Preliminary is targeted at the interests and experiences of adult learners, while B1 Preliminary for Schools is designed specifically for school-aged students and is informed by research into how children develop language skills.

== Format ==
Both versions of the exam (B1 Preliminary and B1 Preliminary for Schools) are made up of three exam papers, which cover all four language skills (Reading, Writing, Listening and Speaking). The Speaking paper is taken face-to-face and candidates have the choice of taking the Reading and Writing paper and Listening paper on either a computer or on paper.

== Scoring ==
In February 2016, Cambridge English Scale scores replaced the candidate profile and standardised scores used for pre-2016 results. All candidates (pre- and post-2016) receive a Statement of Results, with those scoring high enough also receiving a certificate.

=== Scoring from February 2016 ===
From 2016, the Statement of Results and the Certificate have the following information about the candidate’s performance:

- A score on the Cambridge English Scale for each skill (Reading, Writing, Listening and Speaking)
- A score on the Cambridge English Scale for the overall exam
- A grade (Pass with Distinction, Pass with Merit and Pass) for the overall exam
- A CEFR level for the overall exam.

The candidate’s overall score is averaged from the individual scores for each paper (Reading, Writing, Listening and Speaking).

B1 Preliminary is targeted at CEFR Level B1, but also provides reliable assessment at the level above B1 (Level B2) and the level below (Level A2). The following scores are used to report results:

The following scores are used to report results:

Grade	Cambridge English Scale Score (120–170)	CEFR Level
Grade A	160–170	B2
Grade B	153–159	B1
Grade C	140–152	B1
CEFR Level A2	120–139	A2

Scores between 102 and 119 are also reported on the Statement of Results but candidates will not receive the Preliminary English Test certificate.

== Usage ==
B1 Preliminary demonstrates language proficiency at Level B1 of the Common European Framework of Reference (CEFR).

It is an intermediate-level qualification and is designed to show that a successful candidate has the ability to use English language skills to deal with everyday written and spoken communications, e.g. read simple books/textbooks and articles, write simple letters on familiar subjects, and make notes during meetings/lessons.

Learners can use this qualification for education or work purposes, as well as to progress to higher level English language qualifications such as B2 First, C1 Advanced and C2 Proficiency. Many higher education institutions around the world accept and use B1 Preliminary as an indication of English language proficiency.

== See also ==
- Cambridge Assessment English
- Cambridge English Qualifications
- A2 Key
- B2 First
- C1 Advanced
- C2 Proficiency
