= B2 First =

English Level Classification

- Year started: 1939

B2 First, previously known as Cambridge English: First and the First Certificate in English (FCE), is an English language examination provided by Cambridge Assessment English (previously known as Cambridge English Language Assessment and the University of Cambridge ESOL examinations).

B2 First shows that learners have the language skills needed to communicate confidently in an English-speaking environment. It is targeted at Level B2 of the Common European Framework of Reference (CEFR).

B2 First is one of the examinations in Cambridge English Qualifications, each of which aligns with a particular level of the CEFR.

There are Cambridge English Qualifications for schools, general and higher education, and business. B2 First is offered in two versions, B2 First for Schools, for school-aged learners, and B2 First, for general and higher education adult learners.

== History ==
B2 First (previously known as the Lower Certificate in English (LCE), First Certificate in English (FCE) and Cambridge English: First) was originally launched in 1939.

The arrival of thousands of refugees from the Spanish Civil War and occupied Europe into the UK had created a growing need for language assessment. One hundred and forty-four students sat the first LCE exam on 21 June 1939. The exam was divided into three sections:

1. Oral (Dictation, Reading Aloud, and Conversation)
2. English Composition and Language (2 hours for a free composition on a choice of subjects and various tests on the correct use of simple English)
3. Prescribed Texts (2 hours on Dickens, Swift, Shaw and/or the Oxford English Coursebook).

By 1943, the exam included a choice between "either prescribed texts or a paper in translation from and into English". By 1944, 18 languages were catered for in the translation paper, including Polish, Arabic, Hebrew, Czech, Persian and Swedish.

Many of those who took the exam served on active duty during World War II. The December 1943 exam pass list includes candidates from the Polish Army, the Polish Institute of Air Force Technology (RAF), the Netherlands Fleet Air Arm, and the Czechoslovak RAF Squadron. On one day in 1948 over 2,500 men and women of the Polish Resettlement Corps took the exam.

A special version of the exam was also made available to prisoners of war detained in Britain and occupied Europe. The test was made available to 1,500 prisoners of war in Britain, 900 of them Italians. In Germany, the test was offered at seven prisoners-of-war camps, with Indian prisoners of war encouraged to take the exam and/or School Certificate exams. After the war, the exam proved to be the most popular Cambridge English exam of the time, with over 4,000 candidates in 1947, compared to 2,028 candidates for the Certificate of Proficiency in English, now known as C2 Proficiency.

In 1975, driven by evolving principles of communicative language teaching and testing, the exam was revised. The qualification was further updated in 1984 and 1996. Following the 1996 revision, the exam covered a greater range of writing, listening and speaking micro-skills. Its Speaking test format used two candidates and two examiners and the five papers were equally weighted, each representing 20% of the available marks.

In January 2015, another set of revisions was introduced. The main changes were: the overall exam is now 30 minutes shorter; there are four exam papers, instead of five; and the Reading and Use of English papers have been combined into a single paper.

== Format ==
B2 First is available in two versions: B2 First for adult learners, and B2 First for Schools, is designed for school-aged learners. Both are part of the Cambridge English Qualifications. B2 First and B2 First for Schools both have the same exam format (e.g. number of papers, number of questions, time allowance), but use different topics and content, targeted at the interests and experiences of adult and school-aged learners respectively.

Both versions of the exam (B2 First and B2 First for Schools) are made up of four papers, which cover all the key language skills (Reading and Use of Language, Writing, Listening, and Speaking).

The Speaking paper is taken face-to-face. Candidates have the choice of taking the Reading and Use of English paper, Writing paper and Listening paper on either a computer or on paper.

== Scoring ==
In January 2015, Cambridge English Scale scores replaced the candidate profile and standardised scores used for pre-2015 results. All candidates (pre- and post-2015) receive a Statement of Results, with those scoring high enough also receiving a certificate.

=== Scoring from January 2015 ===
Since 2015, the Statement of Results and the Certificate have the following information about the candidate's performance:

- A score on the Cambridge English Scale for each skill (Reading, Writing, Listening and Speaking) and Use of English
- A score on the Cambridge English Scale for the overall exam
- A grade (A, B, C, Level B1) for the overall exam
- A CEFR level for the overall exam.

The certificate also contains the UK National Qualifications Framework (NQF) level.

The candidate's overall score is averaged from the individual scores for each skill (Reading, Writing, Listening and Speaking) and the use of English.

B2 First is targeted at CEFR Level B2 but also provides reliable assessment at the level above B2 (Level C1) and the level below (B1). The following scores are used to report results:

Grade	Cambridge English Scale Score (140–190)	CEFR Level
A	180–190	C1
B	173–179	B2
C	160–172	B2
CEFR Level B1	140–159	B1

Scores between 122 and 139 are also reported on the Statement of Results but candidates will not receive a certificate.

=== Scoring pre-2015 ===
Pre-2015, the Statement of Results had the following information, reflecting the total combined score from all four papers:

- A grade (A, B, C, Level B1) for the overall exam
- A score (out of 100) for the overall exam
- A CEFR level for the overall exam.

Grade	Score (total mark of 100)	CEFR Level
A	80–100	C1
B	75–79	B2
C	60–74	B2
CEFR Level B1	45–59	B1

Pre-2015 Statement of Results also had a Candidate Profile, which showed the candidate's performance on each of the individual papers against the following scale: exceptional, good, borderline and weak.

Pre-2015 candidates who achieved a score of 45 or more (out of 100) received a certificate.

== Usage ==
B2 First demonstrates language proficiency at Level B2 of the Common European Framework of Reference (CEFR) and is used for study and work purposes.

It is an upper-intermediate qualification used to demonstrate that a candidate can use everyday written and spoken English for work and study purposes. By taking up and passing the B2 First (formerly known as the FCE and First Certificate Exam), the candidate certifies that they can understand the main ideas of complex communication, interact with some degree of fluency and spontaneity without great difficulty, engage in discussion in both familiar and unfamiliar situations, interact spontaneously without too much trouble, and communicate in detail, appropriate to the purpose and audience. Many higher education institutions and professional employers accept B2 First for admissions or recruitment purposes.

== See also ==
- Cambridge Assessment English
- Cambridge English Qualifications
- A2 Key
- B1 Preliminary
- C1 Advanced
- C2 Proficiency
