= A2 Key =

English language examination provided by Cambridge Assessment English

A2 Key previously known as Cambridge English: Key and the Key English Test (KET), is an English language examination provided by Cambridge Assessment English (previously known as Cambridge English Language Assessment and University of Cambridge ESOL examinations).

A2 Key is targeted at novice students of English. It tests for proficiency in simple communication to Level A2 of the Common European Framework of Reference (CEFR).

A2 Key offers two versions: one for school-aged learners; and for general education.

== History ==
A2 Key (previously known as the Key English Test (KET) and Cambridge English: Key) was developed through trials conducted between 1991 and 1994.

It was created to offer students a basic qualification in English and provide the first step for those wishing to progress towards higher level qualifications, such as B1 Preliminary, B2 First, C1 Advanced, and C2 Proficiency. An updated version of A2 Key was launched in March 2004, following a review with stakeholders.

== Comparison of two versions of A2 Key ==
A2 Key is designed for adult learners. It is one of the exams that make up Cambridge English Qualifications for general and higher education. A2 Key for Schools is designed for school-aged learners. It is one of the exams that make up Cambridge English Qualifications for Schools.

The two tests have the same exam format; e.g. number of papers, number of questions, and time allowance. They both help students to develop real-life communication skills, and both lead to the same certificate.

The exams use different topics and content:

- A2 Key is targeted at the interests and experiences of adult learners and is designed to support a wide range of learners, whether they want to get into university, start their own business or develop their career.
- A2 Key for Schools is designed specifically for school-aged students. The topics and tasks on the exam are designed to reinforce the learning students do in class.

== Format ==
Both versions of the exam (A2 Key and A2 Key for Schools) are made up of three papers, which cover all four language skills (Reading, Writing, Listening and Speaking).

The Speaking paper is taken face-to-face and candidates have the choice of taking the Reading and Writing paper and Listening paper on a computer or paper.

1. Reading and Writing (1 hour 10 minutes – 50% of total marks)

The Reading and Writing paper has nine parts and 56 questions. Candidates are expected to be able to read and understand simple written information such as signs, brochures, newspapers, and magazines.

Parts 1 to 5 focus on reading skills, including underlying knowledge of vocabulary and grammar. The exam includes tasks such as supplying missing words, matching statements with given texts, selecting the right word for each gap in a given text, and completing multiple-choice questions about a given text.

Parts 6 and 7 focus on writing skills. Part 6 requires writing an email of 25 words minimum, whereas part 7 requires a story of 35 words minimum based on three picture prompts. Candidates can either choose one of the two parts.

2. Listening (approximately 30 minutes – 25% of total marks)

The Listening paper has five parts comprising 25 questions. Candidates are expected to understand spoken material in both informal and neutral settings on a range of everyday topics when spoken reasonably slowly.

Part 1 has five short conversations and three pictures. Candidates listen for information such as prices, numbers, times, dates, locations, directions, shapes, sizes, weather, descriptions, etc. They then answer five multiple-choice questions.

Part 2 has a recording of a monologue. Candidates write down information from the monologue to complete a message or notes.

Part 3 has a longer conversation than those in Part 1. Candidates listen for key information in the conversation and answer five multiple-choice questions.

Part 4 has five short monologues and dialogues. Candidates identify the main idea, gist, topic, or message in the recordings and then answer five multiple-choice questions.

Part 5 has another long conversation. Candidates identify simple factual information in the conversation and match together two lists of words (e.g. names of people and the food they like to eat).

3. Speaking (8–10 minutes – 25% of total marks)

The Speaking test has two parts and is conducted face-to-face with one or two other candidates and two examiners. Candidates are expected to demonstrate conversation skills by answering and asking simple questions.

Part 1 is a conversation with the examiner. Candidates give factual/personal information about themselves, e.g. about their daily life, interests, etc.

Part 2 has two phases, the first of which is a collaborative task with the other candidate(s) and the other further discussion with the examiner. In the first phase, the examiner gives each candidate a prompt card and asks them to talk with the other candidate(s) and ask and answer questions related to the prompt card. In phase 2, the examiner asks the candidates questions related to the prompt card.

== Scoring ==
In February 2016, Cambridge English Scale scores replaced the candidate profile and standardised scores used for pre-2016 results. All candidates (pre- and post-2016) receive a Statement of Results, with those scoring high enough also receiving a certificate.

=== Scoring from February 2016 ===
From 2016, the Statement of Results and the Certificate have the following information about the candidate's performance:

- A score on the Cambridge English Scale for each of the three papers (Reading and Writing, Listening and Speaking)
- A score on the Cambridge English Scale for the overall exam
- A grade (A, B, C or Level A1) for the overall exam
- A CEFR level for the overall exam.

The candidate's overall score is averaged from the individual scores for each paper (Reading and Writing, Listening and Speaking).

Cambridge English: Key is targeted at CEFR Level A2, but also provides reliable assessment at the level above A2 (Level B1) and the level below (Level A1). The following scores are used to report results:

Grade	Cambridge English Scale Score (100–150)	CEFR Level
A	140–150	B1
B	133–139	A2
C	120–132	A2
CEFR Level A1	100–119	A1

Scores under 100 are reported on the Statement of Results but candidates will not receive the A2 Key certificate.

=== Scoring pre-February 2016 ===
Pre-2016, the Statement of Results had the following information, reflecting the total combined score from all three papers:

- A grade (Pass with Distinction, Pass with Merit and Pass) for the overall exam
- A score (out of 100) for the overall exam
- A CEFR level for the overall exam.

Grade	Score (total mark out of 100)	CEFR Level
Pass with Distinction	90–100	B1
Pass with Merit	85–89	A2
Pass	70–84	A2
CEFR Level A1	45–69	A1

Pre-2016, the Statement of Results had a Candidate Profile, which showed the candidate's performance on each of the individual papers against the following scale: exceptional, good, borderline and weak.

Pre-2016, candidates who achieved a score of 45 or more (out of 100) received a certificate.

== Timing and results ==
Candidates take the Reading and Writing and the Listening papers on the same day. The Speaking paper is often taken a few days before or after the Reading and Writing and the Listening papers, or on the same day.

The exam is available to be taken at test centres in paper-based and computer-based formats. Both versions of the exam award the same internationally accepted certificate. The Speaking test is only available to be taken face-to-face with an examiner.

The paper-based exam and the computer-based exam are offered at test centres throughout the calendar year.

Successful candidates receive two documents: a Statement of Results and a certificate. Universities, employers, and other organisations may require either of these documents as proof of English language skills.

An online Statement of Results is available to candidates four to six weeks after the paper-based exam and two weeks after the computer-based exam. Successful candidates (those scoring above 45) receive a hard-copy certificate within two months of the paper-based exam and within four weeks of the computer-based exam.

== Usage ==
A2 Key demonstrates language proficiency at Level A2 of the Common European Framework of Reference (CEFR).

It is designed to show that a successful candidate has English language skills to deal with basic situations, e.g. they can understand simple written English such as short notices, understand simple spoken directions, communicate in familiar situations, use basic phrases and expressions, write short, simple notes and interact with English speakers who talk slowly and clearly.

Learners can use this qualification for education or work purposes, as well as to progress to higher-level English language qualifications, such as B1 Preliminary, B2 First, C1 Advanced and C2 Proficiency.

Many higher education institutions around the world recognise A2 Key as an indication of English language ability. This includes universities based in:

- Brazil (e.g. Universidade Católica de Brasilia)
- Chile (e.g. Universidad de Santiago de Chile)
- Egypt (e.g. Alexandria University)
- Mexico (e.g. Universidad Autonoma del Estado Mexico)
- Myanmar (e.g. University of Computer Studies, Yangon)
- Vietnam (e.g. Tra Vinh University)
- Spain (e.g. Universidad Salamanca).

Additionally, many global companies and brands accept A2 Key as part of their recruitment processes including Chelsea Football Club Academy.

== See also ==
- Cambridge Assessment English
- Cambridge English Qualifications
- B1 Preliminary
- B2 First
- C1 Advanced
- C2 Proficiency
