= Michigan English Test =

Logo

The Michigan English Test (MET) is a multilevel, modular English language examination, which measures English language proficiency in personal, public, occupational and educational contexts. It is developed by CaMLA, a not-for-profit collaboration between the University of Michigan and the University of Cambridge and has been in use since 2008.

The MET can be taken by learners at a range of levels, from upper beginners to lower advanced (Levels A2 to C1 of the Common European Framework of Reference for Languages (CEFR)). It is recognized as official proof of English language ability in many countries around the world. It is a modular test, meaning that the test taker can choose to take one or more of the three modules of the test: Listening/Reading; Speaking; and Writing.

== Test format ==
The MET is available both as a digital and as a paper-and pencil test, and may be taken as either a 2-skill exam (Listening and Reading) or a 4-skill exam (Listening, Reading, Writing, and Speaking). The digital version of the MET can be taken either in a testing center, or at home, with a remote proctor.

The sections of the MET exam are described below.

Section	Time	Question types
Listening/Reading Test, Section One: Listening	45 minutes	Multiple-choice questions with four options. There is only one correct answer for each question. Each conversation / talk is heard once. Part 1 (approx. 20 questions): test takers hear a short conversation between two people. After each conversation, the test taker answers a question about it. Part 2 (approx. 20 questions): test takers hear a longer conversation between two people. After each conversation, the test taker answers some questions about it. Part 3 (approx. 20 questions): test takers hear some short talks. After each talk, the test taker answers some questions about it.
Listening/Reading Test, Section Two: Reading	90 minutes	Grammar section (25 questions) followed by Reading section (50 questions). Multiple-choice questions with four options. Grammar section: tests takers read 1 to 2 sentences from which a word or phrase has been removed. Test takers are asked to complete the sentence by selecting the most appropriate word or phrase from four options. Reading section: each set of reading items is followed by 12 to 14 multiple-choice questions. One of two questions test comprehension across more than one reading section. There are typically between two and five reading items in each section: Reading items section A: a short text (approx. 80 words) typical of texts found in newspapers or newsletters, e.g. an advertisement, announcement, description, message, etc. Reading items section B: a short text (approx. 160 words) which may consist of a segment of a memo, letter, resume, glossary, etc. Reading items section C: a 3 to 5 paragraph text (approx. 290 words long), which may be more abstract than the texts in parts A and B, e.g. an academic article that includes argument, exposition, etc.
Speaking Test	10 minutes	A structured one-on-one interaction between an examiner and a test taker, with 5 tasks: Task 1: The test taker describes a picture. Task 2: The test taker talks about a personal experience on a topic related to what is seen in the picture. Task 3: The test taker gives a personal opinion about a topic related to the picture. Task 4: The test taker is presented with a situation and has to explain some advantages and disadvantages related to that situation. Task 5: The test taker is asked to give an opinion on a new topic and to try to convince the examiner to agree with the idea.
Writing Test	45 minutes	The writing test has two tasks: Task 1: test takers are presented with three questions on a related theme. Test takers respond to each question with a series of sentences that connect ideas together. Task 2: test takers are presented with a single prompt. Test takers respond by producing a short essay.

In the Listening/Reading test, each correct answer carries equal weight and there are no points deducted for wrong answers.

The Listening/Reading test is available on a monthly basis (sometimes twice a month) and the Speaking/Writing tests are available on demand. New test forms are developed each time the exam is administered.

== Scoring ==
Test takers receive a CaMLA Score Report, which has the following information:

- The score for each section (0–80).
- A final score (maximum 320), which is the total of the test sections taken.

Test takers have the option to purchase a Certificate of Achievement within four months of the test date. The Certificate of Achievement contains the same information as the Score Report and is professionally presented for display purposes.

MET test scores are also linked to the proficiency levels of the Common European Framework of Reference for Languages (CEFR):

MET Section score	CEFR Level
0–39	A2
40–52	B1
53–63	B2
64–80	C1

MET test scores do not show how many questions were answered correctly. They are calculated using item response theory to ensure that test scores are comparable across the different administered test forms. There is no pass or fail score.

Test takers can take the MET as many times as they want, but are recommended to have at least eight weeks of language study between each attempt.

MET scores represent a test taker's English language proficiency at the time the test was taken. Language ability changes over time; therefore, organizations are advised to consider a test taker's experience with English since they took the test in addition to their test scores.

== Usage ==
The MET can be used for educational purposes, such as when finishing an English language course or seeking to meet English language graduation requirements at universities outside North America. It can also be used for employment purposes, such as applying for a job or a promotion that requires an English language qualification.

The MET is accepted by organisations in countries around the world, including:

- Albania (e.g. Aleksander Moisiu University)
- Argentina (e.g. Academia de Inglés English Centre)
- Bolivia (e.g. Centro Boliviano Americano Fundación Cultural y Educativa)
- Brazil (e.g. Banco do Brasil)
- Chile (e.g. Marketing y Gestión Educacional)
- Colombia (e.g. Universidad Nacional de Colombia)
- Costa Rica (e.g. INTENSA Language Institute)
- Finland (e.g. University of Helsinki Erasmus Exchange)
- Greece (e.g. Supreme Council for Civil Personnel Selection)
- Iran (e.g. Soroor Language Institute)
- Jordan (e.g. Princess Sumaya University for Technology)
- Malaysia (e.g. Lincoln University College)
- Mexico (e.g. Secretaría de Educación Pública)
- Peru (e.g. Instituto Cultural Peruano Norteamericano).

The MET is not used as an admissions test for students applying to university and colleges in the US, Canada and the UK. CaMLA provides the Michigan English Language Assessment Battery (MELAB) for this purpose.

In 2014, the MET was used by test takers with 25 different first language backgrounds (the largest being Albanian, Portuguese and Spanish). It is mainly used by test takers at school, university or in the early stages of their careers:

Age	Proportion of 2014 test population
≤ 12	0.4%
13 – 16	9.1%
17 – 19	12.4%
20 – 22	18.7%
23 – 25	23.1%
26 – 29	13.0%
30 – 39	13.5%
≥ 40	7.5%
Missing data	2.3%

== Preparation ==
Free practice tests, answer keys, and student instructions are available on the official website.

== See also ==
- CaMLA
- CaMLA English Placement Test (EPT)
- Examination for the Certificate of Competency in English (ECCE)
- Examination for the Certificate of Proficiency in English (ECPE)
- MTELP Series
- Michigan English Language Assessment Battery (MELAB)
- Young Learners Tests of English (YLTE)
- Cambridge English Language Assessment
- English as a Foreign or Second Language
