= Examination for the Certificate of Competency in English =

English language qualification

Logo

The Examination for the Certificate in Competency in English (ECCE) is a high-intermediate level English language qualification that focuses on Level B2 of the Common European Framework of Reference for Languages (CEFR).

It is developed by CaMLA, a not-for-profit collaboration between the University of Michigan and the University of Cambridge. The exam has been in use since 1994, but is regularly updated to ensure it reflects current research in language teaching and assessment.

The ECCE is taken by school-aged and adult learners living in countries where the common language is not English. It is used as official documentary evidence of English language competency and it is ranked at B2 level and is accepted by universities, governments and employers all over the world.

The exam has four test sections, which test the four key language skills: listening, reading, writing and speaking.

== Test format ==
The ECCE is a paper-and pencil test, with the following test sections:

Test section	Time	Question types
Listening	30 minutes	Section 1 (30 multiple-choice questions): Test takers listen to some short conversations between two speakers. Each conversation is followed by a question with three answer choices shown as pictures. Section 2 (20 multiple-choice questions): Test takers listen to some short talks delivered by single speakers. Each talk is followed by 4 to 6 questions.
Grammar, vocabulary, reading	90 minutes	Grammar section (35 multiple-choice questions) and Vocabulary section (35 multiple-choice questions): test takers read sentences, from which a word or phrase has been removed. Test takers are asked to complete the sentence by selecting the most appropriate word or phrase from four options. Reading section (30 multiple-choice questions): the reading section has two parts. Part 1: test takers read two short reading passages. Each passage contains language from a formal written context and is typically no shorter than 225 words. Each passage is followed by 5 multiple-choice questions. Part 2: test takers read two sets of four passages on a related topic. Each set of passages is followed by 10 multiple-choice questions. The following text types are included in each of the two sets of four passages: Text A (up to 80 words): a short and realistic text, typical of texts found in newspapers and newsletters.; Text B (up to 120 words): a longer text, typical of texts found in advertising material, press releases or correspondence; Text C (up to 120 words): continuous prose, typically taken from genres such as press releases or correspondence; Text D (up to 220 words): paragraphs of continuous prose.
Writing	30 minutes	The test taker reads a short excerpt from a newspaper article and then writes a letter or essay giving an opinion about a situation or issue. There is no word limit but test takers are advised to write about one page.
Speaking	15 minutes	A structured one-on-one interaction between an examiner and a test taker, with 4 tasks: Task 1 (2–3 minutes): the test taker and the examiner introduce themselves. Task 2 (3–4 minutes): the test taker is given a picture prompt and must ask questions to find out more about the situation. Task 3 (1–3 minutes): the test taker is asked to make a choice between two options, defend their choice and explain why they did not select the alternative option. Task 4 (2–4 minutes): the test taker and the examiner discuss the topic area of the picture prompt in more detail.

The texts and tasks in the exam reflect a range of personal, public, occupational and educational situations that they might encounter in real-life. The topics are designed to be accessible to all ages and test takers do not require specialized knowledge or experience to complete the test.

A new test form is developed each time the exam is administered.

== Scoring ==
Test takers receive a CaMLA Examination Report, which has the following information:

- A score for each section (0–1,000), with a brief description of the test taker's performance
- An overall result (Honors/Pass/Fail), which is calculated by averaging the scores received for each section.

The following scores are needed to achieve a Honors/Pass/Fail result:

Score band	Score
Honors (H)	840–1,000
Pass (P)	750–835
Low Pass (LP)	650–745
Borderline Fail (BF)	610–645
Fail (F)	0–605

Test takers who achieve an overall score of 650 or higher are awarded the ECCE Certificate. Test takers who achieve a score of 840 or higher in all four sections are awarded a Certificate of Competency with Honors. The ECCE Certificate is recognized at the B2 level of the Common European Framework of Reference for Languages (CEFR).

Test takers are given a numeric score for each section of the test so they can see the areas in which they have done well and the areas in which they need to improve.

An ECCE qualification is valid for life. However, language ability changes over time, therefore, organizations are advised to consider a test taker's experience with English since they took the test in addition to their test scores.

== Usage ==
The ECCE is used as official documentary evidence of English language proficiency. It is accepted by universities, governments and employers in many countries around the world, including:

- Albania (e.g. Ministry of Education and Science)
- Argentina (e.g. Universidad Católica Argentina (UCA))
- Bolivia (e.g. Centro Boliviano Americano Fundación Cultural y Educativa)
- Brazil (e.g. Banco do Brasil)
- Chile (e.g. Universidad Tecnológica de Chile (INACAP))
- Colombia (e.g. Ministry of National Education)
- Finland (e.g. University of Helsinki Erasmus Exchange)
- France (e.g. L'université François-Rabelais de Tours)
- Greece (e.g. Supreme Council for Civil Personnel Selection)
- Iran (e.g. Soroor Language Institute)
- Italy (e.g. Free University of Bozen-Bolzano)
- Jordan (e.g. Princess Sumaya University for Technology)
- Malaysia (e.g. Lincoln University College)
- Mexico (e.g. Mexican Ministry of Education))
- Peru (e.g. University of Lima)
- Romania (e.g. Ministry of Education and Scientific Research)
- Spain (e.g. Universidad Autónoma de Madrid)
- United States (e.g. DeVry University, Keller School of International Management)
- Uruguay (e.g. Instituto de Profesores Artigas (IPA)).

In 2014, the ECCE was used by test takers with 36 different first language backgrounds (the largest being Albanian, Greek, Portuguese and Spanish). It is mainly taken by secondary school-aged learners:

Age	Proportion of 2014 test population
≤ 12	3%
13 – 16	80%
17 – 19	5%
20 – 22	3%
23 – 25	3%
26 – 29	2%
30 – 39	2%
≥ 40	1%
Missing data	≤ 1%

== Preparation ==
Free practice tests, answer keys and student instructions are available on the official website, along with links to other practice materials.

== See also ==
- CaMLA
- CaMLA English Placement Test (EPT)
- Examination for the Certificate of Proficiency in English (ECPE)
- MTELP Series
- Michigan English Language Assessment Battery (MELAB)
- Michigan English Test (MET)
- Young Learners Tests of English (YLTE)
- Cambridge English Language Assessment
- English as a Foreign or Second Language
