= Contrastive =

Contrastive may refer to one of several concepts in linguistics:

- Contrast (linguistics)
- Contrastive linguistics
- Contrastive distribution
- Contrastive analysis
- Contrastive rhetoric
- Contrastive focus reduplication
- Contrastive stress
- Contrastive wa; see Japanese grammar
- Contrastive units, a basic unit of sound
  - Chroneme
  - Phoneme

== See also ==
- Contrast (disambiguation)
