= MELAB =

English language proficiency test

The Michigan English Language Assessment Battery (or MELAB) was a standardized test, created by CaMLA, which evaluated proficiency in understanding, writing and speaking the English language. It was designed for adults whose first language is not English, and was often used as a university admission criterion to judge whether applicants are sufficiently fluent to follow an English-language study program at a university level.

The test included three mandatory parts and one optional:

- Written composition
- Listening comprehension
- Grammar, cloze, vocabulary and reading comprehension multiple-choice questions
- An optional speaking test in the form of a one-on-one interview with an examiner

The MELAB was discontinued in June 2018.

== See also ==
- CaMLA
- CaMLA English Placement Test (EPT)
- Examination for the Certificate of Competency in English (ECCE)
- Examination for the Certificate of Proficiency in English (ECPE)
- MTELP Series
- Michigan English Test (MET)
- Young Learners Tests of English (YLTE)
- Cambridge English Language Assessment
- English as a Foreign or Second Language
