= MTELP Series =

English language assessment test

Logo

The Michigan Test of English Language Proficiency (MTELP Series) is used by institutions to measure the achievement and progress of English language learners within a language program. It is produced by CaMLA, a not-for-profit collaboration between the University of Michigan and the University of Cambridge.

The MTELP Series is available at three levels, Level 1 (beginner), Level 2 (intermediate) and Level 3 (advanced). It tests the following key skills: listening comprehension, reading comprehension, grammatical knowledge and vocabulary range. It is suitable for adults or young adult learners and can be taken on either a computer or on paper.

== Test format ==
The MTELP Series is available at three levels: Level 1 (beginner), Level 2 (intermediate) and Level 3 (advanced).

Each level of the test has three forms of the test (Forms A, B and C), which are parallel in difficulty. Each form has unique content— no questions are shared across the different forms.

The forms, at each level, use the same test format:

- The test lasts 50 minutes
- There are 60 questions.

Since May 2015, the MTELP Series has been available in both computer-based and paper-based format. The computer-based test contains exactly the same items, in exactly the same order, as the paper-based test.

=== Level 1 ===
MTELP Series Level 1 has the following test sections:

Section of the test	Number of questions	Question types
Listening comprehension	25	Question type 1: test takers hear a short conversation between two speakers and answer a question about the conversation by selecting the most appropriate response from three options. Question type 2: test takers hear a question or statement requiring a response and select the most appropriate response from three options.
Grammar	15	Test takers read a printed statement or short conversational exchange between two speakers, where part of the statement or exchange has been omitted. Test takers are asked to correctly complete the statement or exchange by selecting the most appropriate word or phrase from four options.
Vocabulary	11	Test takers read a sentence where one word has been removed. Test takers are asked to correctly complete the sentence by selecting the most appropriate word from four options.
Reading comprehension	9	Test takers are presented with four short reading passages, followed by two or three questions that tap into a range of reading skills. Test takers must select the correct answer to each question from four options.

=== Level 2 ===
MTELP Series Level 2 has the following test sections:

Section of the test	Number of questions	Question types
Listening comprehension	25	Question type 1: test takers hear a short conversation between two speakers and answer a question about the conversation by selecting the most appropriate response from three options. Question type 2: test takers hear a short talk from a single speaker, followed by a series of questions about the talk. Test takers must select the correct answer to each question from three options.
Grammar	10	Test takers read a printed statement or short conversational exchange between two speakers, where part of the statement or exchange has been omitted. Test takers are asked to correctly complete the statement or exchange by selecting the most appropriate word or phrase from four options.
Vocabulary	10	Test takers read a sentence where one word has been removed. Test takers are asked to correctly complete the sentence by selecting the most appropriate word from four options.
Reading comprehension	15	Test takers are presented with three reading passages, followed by several questions that tap into a range of reading skills. Test takers must select the correct answer to each question from four options.

=== Level 3 ===
MTELP Series Level 3 has the following test sections:

Section of the test	Number of questions	Question types
Listening comprehension	22	Question type 1: test takers hear a conversation between two speakers, followed by three or four question about the conversation. Test takers must answer each questions by selecting the most appropriate response from three options. Question type 2: test takers hear an interview featuring several speakers, followed by a series of questions. Test takers must answer each questions by selecting the most appropriate response from three options.
Grammar	7	Test takers read a printed statement or short conversational exchange between two speakers, where part of the statement or exchange has been omitted. Test takers are asked to correctly complete the statement or exchange by selecting the most appropriate word or phrase from four options.
Vocabulary	8	Test takers read a sentence where one word has been removed. Test takers are asked to correctly complete the sentence by selecting the most appropriate word from four options.
Cloze	8	Test takers read a cloze passage where 8 words have been removed. Test takers must complete the intended meaning of the original passage by selecting the most appropriate word for each gap from four options.
Reading comprehension	15	Test takers are presented with three reading passages, followed by several questions that tap into a range of reading skills. Test takers must select the correct answer to each question from four options.

== Scoring ==
In the computer-based test, results are available instantly as soon as the test is completed.

In the paper-based test, the institution scores the test using the provided scoring template. Institutions can administer the test, calculate scores and report back to test takers within one day.

Test takers receive a scaled score between 0–100. If the test taker receives a score that indicates that the test is too difficult or too easy for them, the institution should consider using a different MTELP level.

MTELP Series Level	Scores which indicate the test is too difficult	Scores which indicate the test is appropriate	Scores which indicate the test is too easy
Level 1	–	2–49	50–100
Level 2	6–25	25–74	75–100
Level 3	15–50	51–100	–

CaMLA recommends that Level 3 is used only with high proficiency students, otherwise the test taker's score might be so low as to be uninterpretable. Low proficiency students should probably take only Level 1 if institutions want interpretable information about the test taker's language proficiency.

== Usage ==
MTELP Series is used as a progress test and exit (achievement) test by many different types of institutions. This includes ESL/EFL Schools, intensive English programs at colleges and universities, government agencies, and private corporations. Examples include: Andrews University, Cambridge College, and New America College.

Institutions that use the CaMLA English Placement Test (EPT) to place learners in level-appropriate classes may then measure the learner's progress during the course using the MTELP Series tests, which provide test items at more focused levels.

The table below shows which level of MTELP Series is most appropriate for a learner based on their CaMLA EPT score.

CaMLA EPT Score	Appropriate MTELP Series level
0–34	Level 1 (beginner)
35–60	Level 2 (intermediate)
61–80	Level 3 (advanced)

== Preparation ==
CaMLA provides free sample test questions for MTELP Series Level 1, Level 2 and Level 3.

== See also ==
- CaMLA
- CaMLA English Placement Test (EPT)
- Examination for the Certificate of Competency in English (ECCE)
- Examination for the Certificate of Proficiency in English (ECPE)
- Michigan English Language Assessment Battery (MELAB)
- Michigan English Test (MET)
- Young Learners Tests of English (YLTE)
- Cambridge English Language Assessment
- English as a Foreign or Second Language
