= Young Learners Tests of English =

Logo

The Young Learners Tests of English (YLTE) is a set of English language tests for learners in primary and middle grades. The tests are developed by CaMLA, a non-profit collaboration between the University of Michigan and the University of Cambridge.

The tests cover all four language skills: listening, reading, writing and speaking. They focus on American English and are available at three levels: Bronze (beginner), Silver and Gold (early intermediate).

== Test format ==
The YLTE is a pen-and-paper test.

The Bronze, Silver and Gold tests all have three test sections:

- Listening
- Reading and writing
- Speaking

The printed test booklets use American English spellings and vocabulary. However, both British and American English are accepted in the student's written answers and in the speaking test.

=== Bronze ===
The YLTE Bronze test has the following test sections:

Section	Time	Question types
Listening	About 20 minutes	Part 1 (5 questions): students see a picture with seven objects around the outside. They listen to five short conversations between a male and a female voice. Students draw a line from each object mentioned in the dialogue to the right place on the big picture. Part 2 (5 questions): students see a picture to set the scene and some questions. They listen to a conversation between a child and an adult. The answer to each question will be either a number or a name. Part 3 (5 questions): students hear five short conversations between different pairs of people. There is a question about each conversation and students choose which of three pictures gives the answer to the question. Part 4 (5 questions): students see a picture with seven examples of the same object (e.g. seven hats). They listen to a conversation between an adult and a child and color each object named using the color mentioned in the conversation.
Reading and writing	20 minutes	Part 1 (five questions): students look at five little pictures of objects and read a sentence about each object. If the statement is true students put a check mark in the box, if it is false they put an “X” in the box. Part 2 (five questions): students look at a picture and read five sentences about it. If the sentence is true, students write “yes”, if the sentence is false they write “no”. Part 3 (five questions): students look at a picture of an object. After each picture there are some dashes (- - - -) that show how many letters are in the word. There are also some jumbled letters (e.g. B O K O). Students have to put the jumbled letters in the right order to make the word. Part 4 (five questions): students read a text with five gaps. Under the text is a box with labelled pictures. Students need to choose a word from the box and copy it into each gap. Part 5 (five questions): students look at three pictures which tell a story. There are questions for each of the pictures. Students write one-word answers to each of the questions.
Speaking	3–5 minutes	Part 1: the examiner will greet the student, asks them their name and asks them to point to things in a big picture. E.g. where is the monkey? Part 2: the examiner shows the student some small pictures of objects. The examiner names three objects and asks the child to point to them and put them in the right place on the big picture looked at in Part 1. E.g. put the shell under the tree. Part 3: the examiner will ask some questions about the big picture. E.g. What is this? What color is it? Part 4: the examiner will ask some questions about the small pictures of objects. E.g. What is this? Do you have a bike? Part 5: the examiner will ask the student some questions about themselves. E.g. your age, family, school, friends.

=== Silver ===
The YLTE Silver test has the following test sections:

Section	Time	Question types
Listening	About 25 minutes	Part 1 (5 questions): students see a picture that shows people doing different things. There are seven names around the picture. They listen to a conversation between a child and an adult talking about the people in the picture. Students have to draw a line from the name they hear to the correct person in the big picture. Part 2 (5 questions): students hear a conversation between two speakers. On the test booklet there is a form or page from a notepad. Students have to write a word or number in five places on the form/notepad. Part 3 (5 questions): students hear a conversation between a child and an adult. The child is describing what he/she did on different days during one week. Students draw a line from the day of the week to the right picture which shows what the child did on that day. Part 4 (5 questions): students listen to five short dialogues. There is a question about each conversation and students choose which of three pictures gives the answer to the question. Part 5 (five questions): students see a picture with different objects. They listen to a conversation between an adult and a child and color each object named using the color mentioned in the conversation. They will also be asked to draw a simple object and write a short word somewhere in the picture.
Reading and writing	30 minutes	Part 1 (six questions): students look at pictures of objects with their names written underneath. Students read some definitions and decide which picture matches each definition. Part 2 (six questions): students look at a picture and read six sentences about it. If the sentence is true, students write “yes”, if the sentence is false they write “no”. Part 3 (six questions): students read a short conversation between two people. They have to choose what the second speaker says from a set of three choices (A, B or C). Part 4 (seven questions): students read a text with six gaps. Next to the text is a box with labelled pictures. Students need to choose a word from the box and copy it into each gap. Then they choose the best title for the text from a choice of three options. Part 5 (ten questions): students read a story in three parts. Each part has a picture. Students must complete sentences after each part of the story using one, two or three words. Part 6 (five questions): students read a factual text with five gaps. They must choose the correct word from three options to complete each gap.
Speaking	5–7 minutes	Part 1: the examiner will greet the student and asks them their name. The examiner will present two pictures that are similar but have some difference. The test taker must tell the examiner about four of the differences. Part 2: the examiner will show four pictures that tell a story. The examiner will talk about the first picture and then ask the student to continue the story using the other three pictures. Part 3: the examiner will show four sets of four pictures. The test taker must say which picture is the odd one out and explain why. Part 4: the examiner will ask the student some questions about themselves. E.g. about school, hobbies, friends.

=== Gold ===
The YLTE Gold test has the following test sections:

Section	Time	Question types
Listening	About 25 minutes	Part 1 (5 questions): students see a picture that shows people doing different things. There are seven names around the picture. They listen to a conversation between a child and an adult talking about the people in the picture. Students have to draw a line from the name they hear to the correct person in the big picture. Part 2 (5 questions): students hear a conversation between two speakers. On the test booklet there is a form or page from a notepad. Students have to write a word or number in five places on the form/notepad. Part 3 (5 questions): students have two sets of pictures. On the left hand page there are some pictures of named people, named places or objects. On the right hand page there are a set of pictures with letters. Students listen to a conversation between two people and match one of the lettered pictures to one of the named pictures. Part 4 (5 questions): students listen to five short connected dialogues. There is a question about each dialogue and students choose which of three pictures gives the answer to the question. Part 5 (five questions): students see a picture with different objects. They listen to a conversation between an adult and a child and color each object named using the color mentioned in the conversation. They will also be asked to draw and color a simple object and write a short word somewhere in the picture.
Reading and writing	40 minutes	Part 1 (ten questions): students look at fifteen words and ten definitions. They must write the right word beside each definition. Part 2 (seven questions): students look at a picture and read seven sentences about it. If the sentence is true, students write “yes”, if the sentence is false they write “no”. Part 3 (five questions): students read a short conversation between two people. Everything the first speaker says is in the right order. The second speaker's answers are in a separate box. The student must choose the right answer (A, B, C, D or E) for each gap. Part 4 (six questions): students read a text with five gaps. Next to the text is a box with words. Students need to choose a word from the box and copy it into each gap. Then they choose the best title for the text from a choice of three options. Part 5 (seven questions): students read a story, illustrated by one picture. There are seven sentences about the story. Students must complete the sentences using one, two, three or four words. Part 6 (ten questions): students read a factual text with ten gaps. They must choose the correct word from three options to complete each gap. Part 7 (five questions): students read text from a letter or diary with five gaps. They must think of a word to write in each gap.
Speaking	7–9 minutes	Part 1: the examiner will greet the student and asks them their name. The student and the examiner will each have a picture, which are similar but have some differences. The examiner will read some sentences about his/her picture and the test taker must look at their picture and explain how it is different. Part 2: the examiner and the student will take turns to ask and answer questions about the other person's picture. Part 3: the examiner will show five pictures that tell a story. The examiner will talk about the first picture and then ask the student to continue the story using the other four pictures. Part 4: the examiner will ask the student some questions about themselves. E.g. about school, hobbies, birthdays, family, friends.

== Scoring ==
There is no pass/fail score. All test takers receive a certificate, which has the following information:

- A score for each section of the test (maximum score of 5 medals per section)
- A total score (maximum score of 15 medals).

Students who achieve a total of 10 medals or more are ready to start preparing for the next level.

== Usage ==
The YLTE are designed to be used as a way to prepare students for future English-language learning and help them develop their English skills, rather than as an institutional measurement device.

The YLTE is taken by students living in many different countries around the world, such as: Afghanistan, Albania, Brazil, Canada, China, Costa Rica, Colombia, Greece, Italy, Japan, Jordan, Malaysia, Mexico (Ministry of Education), Peru, Portugal, Romania, Serbia, Spain, Ukraine, Uruguay and USA.

== See also ==
- CaMLA
- CaMLA English Placement Test (EPT)
- Examination for the Certificate of Competency in English (ECCE)
- Examination for the Certificate of Proficiency in English (ECPE)
- MTELP Series
- Michigan English Language Assessment Battery (MELAB)
- Michigan English Test (MET)
- Cambridge English Language Assessment
- English as a Foreign or Second Language
