= Examination for the Certificate of Proficiency in English =

English language qualification

Logo

The Examination for the Certificate in Proficiency in English (ECPE) is an advanced level English language qualification that focuses on Level C2 of the Common European Framework of Reference for Languages (CEFR).

It is developed by CaMLA, a not-for-profit collaboration between the University of Michigan and the University of Cambridge. The exam has been in use since 1953, but is regularly updated to ensure it reflects current research in language teaching and assessment.

The ECPE is taken by school-aged and adult learners living in countries where the common language is not English. It is used as official documentary evidence of English language proficiency. Results (issued in the last two years) are accepted by universities, governments and employers around the world.

The exam has four test sections, which test the four key language skills: listening, reading, writing and speaking.

== Test format ==
The ECPE is a paper-and-pencil test, with the following test sections:

Test section	Time	Question types
Listening	50 minutes	Part 1 (20 multiple-choice questions): test takers listen to a short conversation between two speakers, followed by three printed statements. Test takers choose the statement that conveys the same meaning as what was heard. Part 2 (18 multiple-choice questions): test takers listen to a statement or question, followed by three printed responses. Test takers choose the appropriate response to the statement/question. Part 3 (12 multiple-choice questions): test takers listen to three recorded talks / extended conversations. After each conversation/talk, test takers then listen to recorded comprehension questions and choose the correct answer from the question and answer choices printed in their test booklet.
Grammar, cloze, vocabulary, reading	55 minutes	Grammar section (16 multiple-choice questions): test takers read sentences, from which a word or phrase has been removed. Test takers complete the sentence by selecting the most appropriate word or phrase from four options. Cloze (20 multiple-choice questions): test takers read two passages, which each have ten deletions. Test takers must complete each blank by selecting the most appropriate word or phrase. Vocabulary (16 multiple-choice questions): test takers read sentences, from which a word has been removed. Test takers complete the sentence by selecting the most appropriate word from four options. Reading (18 multiple-choice questions): test takers read four reading passages. Each passage is accompanied by five comprehension questions. The reading passages are 250–400 words long.
Writing	45 minutes	Test takers write an essay based upon one of two topic choices. There is no word limit but test takers are advised that their responses will be marked down if they are extremely short.
Speaking	30–35 minutes	A structured two-on-two interaction (two examiners, two test takers), with 5 stages: Stage 1 (3–5 minutes): the test takers and Examiner 1 introduce themselves. Stage 2 (5–7 minutes): each test taker is given an information sheet with descriptions of two options (four different options in total between the two test takers). Test takers are not allowed to look at each other’s information sheets. Test takers are given time to read through their information sheet, then they describe the two options to the other test taker. They must listen carefully to each other because afterward test takers will make a recommendation to their partner of the best option from the two options presented by their partner. At the end of this stage, each test taker decides which of the two options on their information sheet is the best Stage 3 (5–7 minutes): the test takers compare and contrast the options they have individually chosen and discuss the advantages and disadvantages of each option. The test takers must come to an agreement on one single option. Stage 4 (5–7 minutes): the test takers must convince Examiner 2 that the option they have chosen is the best one. At this point, test takers may look at each other’s information sheet if they want. They are given time to collaborate and plan their presentation. Each test taker must present different reasons for deciding on the chosen option and explain why these reasons are important. Stage 5 (5–7 minutes): test takers answer questions (asked by Examiner 2) about the decision they have made and the reasons for that decision.

The texts and tasks in the exam reflect a range of personal, public, occupational and educational situations that they might encounter in real-life. The topics are designed to be accessible to all ages and test takers do not require specialized knowledge or experience to complete the test.

A new test form is developed each time the exam is administered.

== Scoring ==
Test takers receive a CaMLA score report, which has the following information:

- A score for each section (0–1,000), with a brief description of the test taker’s performance
- An overall result (Honors/Pass/Fail), which is calculated by averaging the scores received for each section.

The following scores are needed to achieve a Honors/Pass/Fail result:

Score band	Score
Honors (H)	840–1,000
Pass (P)	750–835
Low Pass (LP)	650–745
Borderline Fail (BF)	610–645
Fail (F)	0–605

Test takers who achieve an overall score of 650 or higher are awarded the ECPE Certificate. Test takers who achieve a score of 840 or higher in all four sections are awarded a Certificate of Proficiency with Honors. The ECPE Certificate is recognized at the C2 level of the Common European Framework of Reference for Languages (CEFR).

Test takers are given a numeric score for each section of the test so they can see the areas in which they have done well and the areas in which they need to improve.

An ECPE qualification is valid for life. It is accepted by many universities as proof of proficiency in English, provided it has been received within the last two years prior to the commencement of one's studies. However, as language abilities may diminish over time, educational institutions are advised to consider a test taker’s competence in English since they took the test, along with their test scores.

== Usage ==
The ECPE is used as official documentary evidence of English language proficiency. It is accepted by universities, governments and employers in many countries around the world, including:

- Albania (e.g. Ministry of Education and Science)
- Argentina (e.g. Universidad Católica Argentina (UCA))
- Bolivia (e.g. Centro Boliviano Americano Fundación Cultural y Educativa)
- Brazil (e.g. Banco do Brasil)
- Chile (e.g. Universidad Tecnológica de Chile (INACAP))
- Colombia (e.g. Ministry of National Education)
- Costa Rica (e.g. Intensa)
- Denmark (e.g. Aarhus University)
- Finland (e.g. University of Helsinki Erasmus Exchange)
- Greece (e.g. Supreme Council for Civil Personnel Selection)
- Iran (e.g. Soroor Language Institute)
- Italy (e.g. Free University of Bozen-Bolzano)
- Jordan (e.g. Princess Sumaya University for Technology)
- Malaysia (e.g. Lincoln University College)
- Mexico (e.g. Mexican Ministry of Education))
- Netherlands (e.g. Marnix Academie)
- Peru (e.g. University of Lima)
- Romania (e.g. Ministry of Education and Scientific Research)
- Spain (e.g. Universitat de Barcelona)
- UK (e.g. University of Manchester, Manchester Business School)
- United States (e.g. University of California, Davis)
- Uruguay (e.g. Instituto de Profesores Artigas (IPA)).

In 2014, the ECPE was used by test takers with 33 different first language backgrounds (the largest being Albanian, Arabic, Greek, Portuguese and Spanish). It is mainly used by test takers at school, university or in the early stages of their careers:

Age	Proportion of 2014 test population
≤ 12	≤ 0.1%
13 – 16	55.2%
17 – 19	10.6%
20 – 22	12.9%
23 – 25	8.4%
26 – 29	5.3%
30 – 39	4.8%
≥ 40	2.6%
Missing data	≤ 0.1%

Most test takers said they took the ECPE for employment purposes (33%), educational purposes (31%) or for personal interest (27%).

Purpose	Proportion of 2014 test population
Personal interest	27.5%
Improve employment	17.8%
Obtain employment	15.7%
Educational Programs Admissions	13.2%
Language Course Requirement	12.2%
Scholarship	5.9%
Other	2.2%
Missing data	5.5%

== Preparation ==
Free practice tests, answer keys and student instructions are available on the official website, along with links to other practice materials.

== See also ==
- CaMLA
- CaMLA English Placement Test (EPT)
- Examination for the Certificate of Competency in English (ECCE)
- MTELP Series
- Michigan English Language Assessment Battery (MELAB)
- Michigan English Test (MET)
- Young Learners Tests of English (YLTE)
- Cambridge English Language Assessment
- English as a Foreign or Second Language
