= Yolande Henderson =

Pakistani teacher

- Born: Yolande Pinto; 14 January 1934
- Died: 5 December 2015 (aged 81); Karachi, Pakistan
- Resting place: Karachi
- Citizenship: Pakistani
- Education: MA in Literature
- Alma mater: Laval University, Canada
- Occupation: High school teacher
- Years active: 1954–2006
- Organization(s): St Patrick's High School, Karachi
- Spouse: Noel Kirby Henderson
- Children: John, Jennifer and William Henderson (teacher)
- Parent(s): Felix Martin and Genevieve Pinto

Yolande Henderson (14 January 1934 – 5 December 2015) was a Pakistani high school teacher.

== Education ==
Yolande Henderson attended St Anne's School in Mumbai before relocating to Pakistan in 1950. After graduating from St Joseph's College in Karachi in 1954, she began her teaching profession.

She obtained a scholarship to Laval University in Canada to pursue her MA in literature, which she completed in 1957.

== Career ==
While Father Stephen Raymond was the principal of St Patrick's High School in Karachi, she joined the faculty. Her teaching career at this institution lasted 34 years until she retired.

Raymond was described as "an educational visionary and leader" in a 2013 memorial to the late Bishop Anthony Theodore Lobo in the Christian Voice. She finished her teacher training while teaching at St. Patrick's.

Henderson took over as headmistress of the "O" Levels division at St Patrick's in 1991. The St Patrick's "O" Levels department was an institution with academics, and extracurricular activities.

Henderson retired in 2006 due to deteriorating health. She is recognized as one of the professors who "focused more on life lessons and character development than on the curriculum."

One of her former pupils praised her as "one of the most well-loved teachers and mentors" during a school reunion on the 150th anniversary of its inception on 18 October 2010. Another student, Roland de Souza, called her "one of the best professors" he had ever had.

The Old Patricians (past students of the school) gave the Yolande Henderson Gold Medal to the highest student from the Cambridge "O" level section at the school's 150th-anniversary closing ceremony on 6 May 2011.

The Society of Pakistan English Language Teachers (SPELT) paid homage to Henderson on 12 October 2012, saying that "her pupils all over the world are better people because of her leadership."

The Express Tribune invited her to write a memorial to the late Bishop Anthony Theodore Lobo, a former administrator of St Patrick's High School, in March 2013.

== Death ==
She died of intestinal cancer on 5 December 2015, at the age of 81, in Karachi. Her funeral was conducted the next day at Karachi's Saint Patrick's Cathedral. She was put to rest at Karachi's Gora Qabaristan.

== Notable students ==
- Rashid Minhas

== Legacy ==
In her honor, an interscholastic basketball event named the Yolande Henderson Memorial Interscholastic Basketball Tournament was established in 2016. St Patrick's High School organized the competition, which was sponsored by the Karachi Basketball Association for both boys and girls.
