= Languages in Contrast =

- Discipline: Contrastive linguistics
- Language: English
- Edited by: Signe Oksefjell Ebeling, Hilde Hasselgård

Publication details
- History: 1998-present
- Publisher: John Benjamins Publishing Company
- Frequency: Biannually

Standard abbreviations
- ISO 4: Lang. Contrast

Indexing
- ISSN: 1387-6759 (print); 1569-9897 (web)
- OCLC no.: 41043603

Links
- Journal homepage; Online access

Languages in Contrast is a peer-reviewed academic journal of contrastive linguistics established in 1998 and published biannually by John Benjamins Publishing Company. Focusing on comparative studies of two or multiple languages, it covers all subfields of both theoretical and applied linguistics, such as morphology, phonology, discourse analysis, language education, etc.

The current editors-in-chief are Signe Oksefjell Ebeling and Hilde Hasselgård (University of Oslo).

== Abstracting and indexing ==
The journal is abstracted and indexed in:

- International Bibliography of Book Reviews of Scholarly Literature and Social Sciences/International Bibliography of Periodical Literature
- Linguistic Bibliography/Bibliographie Linguistique
- Linguistics & Language Behavior Abstracts
- European Reference Index for the Humanities
