= English as a second or foreign language =

Use of English by speakers with different native languages

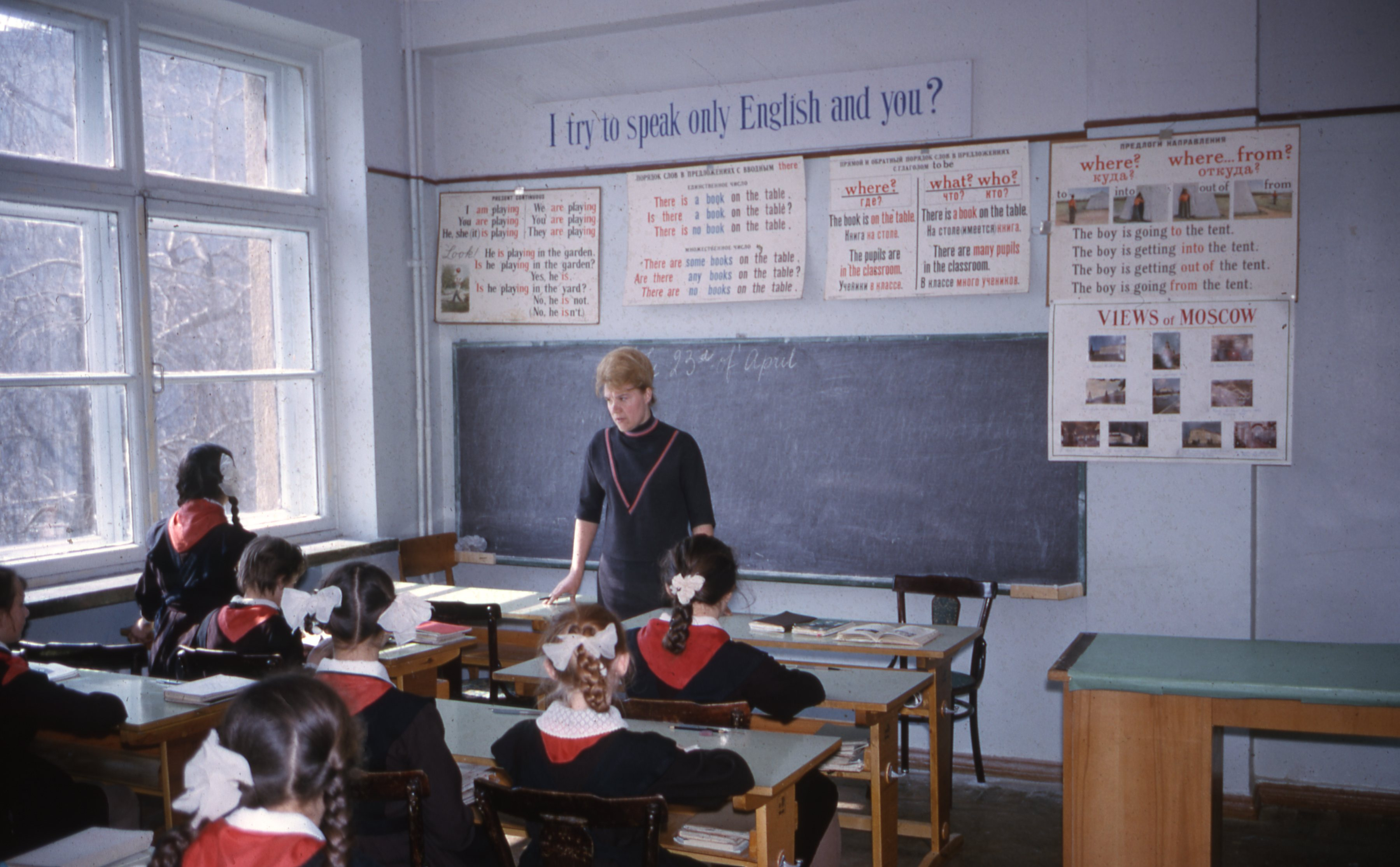
English classes in Moscow in 1964

English as a second or foreign language (ESL or EFL) is the teaching and learning of English by people whose first language is not English. The field includes teaching English as a foreign language (TEFL) in countries where English is not the dominant language and teaching English as a second language (TESL) in English-speaking countries.

English is taught worldwide in schools, universities, language schools, workplaces, and community programs. Learners study English for purposes including education, employment, immigration, and international communication. Teaching methods vary according to learners' needs, proficiency levels, and educational settings, ranging from formal classroom instruction to self-directed study and online learning.

== Definition and purposes ==
The aspect in which EFL is taught is referred to as teaching English as a foreign language (TEFL), teaching English as a second language (TESL) or teaching English to speakers of other languages (TESOL). Technically, TEFL refers to English language teaching in a country where English is not the official language, TESL refers to teaching English to non-native English speakers in a native English-speaking country and TESOL covers both. In practice, however, each of these terms tends to be used more generically across the full field. TEFL is more widely used in the United Kingdom and TESL or TESOL in the United States.

== Usage ==
The term "ESL" has been seen by some to indicate that English would be of subordinate importance; for example, where English is used as a lingua franca in a multilingual country. The term can be a misnomer for some students who have learned several languages before learning English. The terms "English language learners" (ELL), and, more recently, "English learners" (EL), have been used instead, and the students' native languages and cultures are considered important.

== Educational approach ==
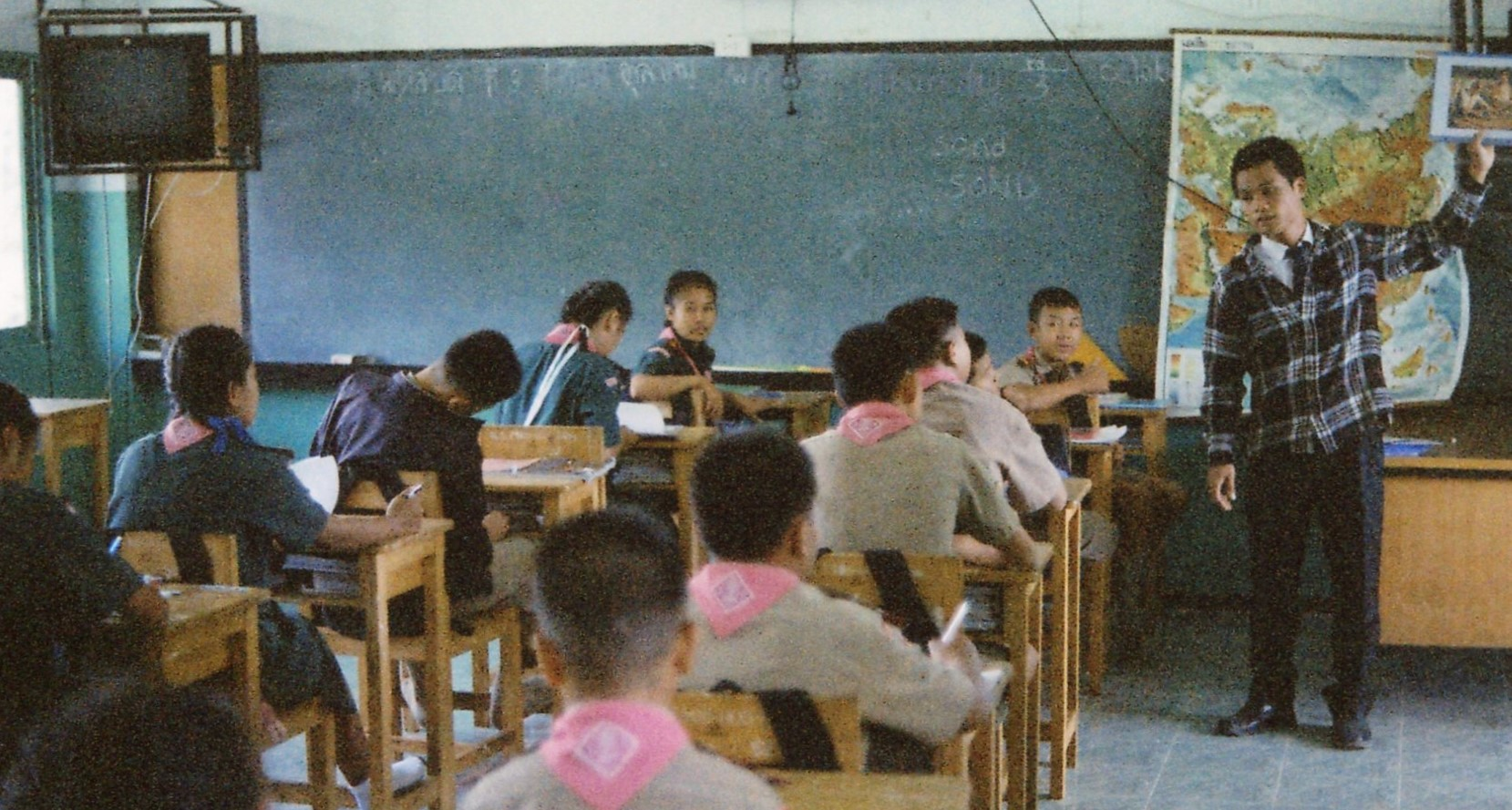
Learning English in a primary school in rural Thailand

Methods of learning English are highly variable, depending on the student's level of English proficiency and the manner and setting in which they are taught, which can range from required classes in school to self-directed study at home, or a blended combination of both. Teaching technique plays an important role in the performance of English language acquisition as a foreign language. In some programs, educational materials (including spoken lectures and written assignments) are provided in a mixture of English, and the student's native language. In other programs, educational materials are always in English, but the vocabulary, grammar, and context clues may be modified to be more easily understood by students with varying levels of comprehension. Adapting comprehension, insight-oriented repetitions, and recasts are some of the methods used in training. However, without proper cultural immersion (social learning grounds) the associated language habits and reference points (internal mechanisms) of the host country are not completely transferred through these programs. Mark Hancock argues that in many second language learning environments, students naturally engage in language "layering", which is blending their native language and English to navigate meaning and to express complex ideas. This study suggests how code-switching can serve as a communicative resource rather than an obstacle to learning. The major engines that influence the language are the United States and the United Kingdom and they both have assimilated the language differently so they differ in expressions and usage. This is found to a great extent primarily in pronunciation and vocabulary. Variants of the English language also exist in both of these countries (e.g. African American Vernacular English).

Recentresearch in second language acquisition emphasizes that the effectiveness of English language education depends not only on exposure, but also on how instruction is structured and delivered. According to Shawn Loewen, English instruction in classrooms is most successful when it incorporates a balance of communicative activities and attention to grammar and form. His work highlights the role of input, interaction, and output which consist of what learners hear or read, speaking and listening to others and learners' own use of English.

In recent years, English language teacher education has increasingly incorporated principles of social justice to address societal inequalities. Scholars such as Darío Luis Banegas emphasize that language teachers can act as agents of change by integrating critical pedagogy and action research into their curricula. This approach, which has gained significant traction in Latin American contexts, encourages educators to explore issues of intersectionality, gender diversity, and local realities in the classroom, moving beyond standardized, globalized language textbooks.

== Influence ==
The English language has a great reach and influence, and English is taught all over the world. In countries where English is not usually a native language, there are two distinct models for teaching English: educational programs for students who want to move to English-speaking countries, and other programs for students who do not intend to move but who want to understand English content for the purposes of education, entertainment, employment or conducting international business. The differences between these two models of English language education have grown larger over time, and teachers focusing on each model have used different terminology, received different training, and formed separate professional associations. English is also taught as a second language for recent immigrants to English-speaking countries, which faces separate challenges because the students in one class may speak many different native languages. Code-switching serves a linguistic strategy to navigate between languages but it cannot fully resolve the deeper cultural pressures those immigrants face.

== Terminology and types ==
The many acronyms and abbreviations used in the field of English teaching and learning may be confusing and the following technical definitions may have their currency contested upon various grounds. The precise usage, including the different use of the terms ESL and ESOL in different countries, is described below. These terms are most commonly used in relation to teaching and learning English as a second language, but they may also be used in relation to demographic information.

English language teaching (ELT) is a widely used teacher-centered term, as in the English language teaching divisions of large publishing houses, or ELT training. Teaching English as a second language (TESL), teaching English to speakers of other languages (TESOL), and teaching English as a foreign language (TEFL) are also used.

Other terms used in this field include English as an international language (EIL), English as a lingua franca (ELF), English for special purposes and English for specific purposes (ESP), and English for academic purposes (EAP). Those who are learning English are often referred to as English language learners (ELL). The learners of the English language are of two main groups. The first group includes the learners learning English as their second language i.e. the second language of their country and the second group includes those who learn English as a totally foreign language i.e. a language that is not spoken in any part of their country.

=== English outside English-speaking countries ===
EFL, English as a foreign language, indicates the teaching of English in a non–English-speaking region. The study can occur either in the student's home country, as part of the normal school curriculum or otherwise, or, for the more privileged minority, in an anglophone country that they visit as a sort of educational tourist, particularly immediately before or after graduating from university. TEFL is the teaching of English as a foreign language; note that this sort of instruction can take place in any country, English-speaking or not. Typically, EFL is learned either to pass exams as a necessary part of one's education or for career progression while one works for an organization or business with an international focus. EFL may be part of the state school curriculum in countries where English has no special status (what linguistic theorist Braj Kachru calls the "expanding circle countries"); it may also be supplemented by lessons paid for privately. Teachers of EFL generally assume that students are literate in their mother tongue. The Chinese EFL Journal and Iranian EFL Journal are examples of international journals dedicated to specifics of English language learning within countries where English is used as a foreign language.

=== English within English-speaking countries ===
The other broad grouping is the use of English within the English-speaking world. In what Braj Kachru calls "the inner circle", i.e., countries such as the United Kingdom and the United States, this use of English is generally by refugees, immigrants, and their children. It also includes the use of English in "outer circle" countries, often former British colonies and the Philippines, where English is an official language even if it is not spoken as a mother tongue by a majority of the population.

In the US, Canada, Australia, and New Zealand this use of English is called ESL (English as a second language). This term has been criticized on the grounds that many learners already speak more than one language. A counter-argument says that the word "a" in the phrase "a second language" means there is no presumption that English is the second acquired language (see also Second language). TESL is the teaching of English as a second language. There are also other terms that it may be referred to in the US including ELL (English Language Learner) and CLD (Culturally and Linguistically Diverse).

In the UK and Ireland, the term ESL has been replaced by ESOL (English for speakers of other languages). In these countries TESOL (teaching English to speakers of other languages) is normally used to refer to teaching English only to this group. In the UK Canada and Ireland, the term EAL (English as an additional language) is used, rather than ESOL, when talking about primary and secondary schools, in order to clarify that English is not the students' first language, but their second or third. The term ESOL is used to describe English language learners who are above statutory school age.

Other acronyms were created to describe the person rather than the language to be learned. The term Limited English proficiency (LEP) was first used in 1975 by the Lau Remedies following a decision of the U.S. Supreme Court. ELL (English Language Learner), used by United States governments and school systems, was created by James Crawford of the Institute for Language and Education Policy in an effort to label learners positively, rather than ascribing a deficiency to them. Recently, some educators have shortened this to EL – English Learner.

Typically, a student learns this sort of English to function in the new host country, e.g., within the school system (if a child), to find and hold down a job (if an adult), or to perform the necessities of daily life (cooking, taking a cab/public transportation, or eating in a restaurant). The teaching of it does not presuppose literacy in the mother tongue. It is usually paid for by the host government to help newcomers settle into their adopted country, sometimes as part of an explicit citizenship program. It is technically possible for ESL to be taught not in the host country, but in, for example, a refugee camp, as part of a pre-departure program sponsored by the government soon to receive new potential citizens. In practice, however, this is extremely rare.

Particularly in Canada and Australia, the term ESD (English as a second dialect) is used alongside ESL, usually in reference to programs for Aboriginal peoples in Canada or Australians. The term refers to the use of standard English by speakers of a creole or non-standard variety. It is often grouped with ESL as ESL/ESD.

=== Umbrella terms ===
All these ways of denoting the teaching of English can be bundled together into an umbrella term. Unfortunately, not all of the English teachers in the world would agree on only one single term. The term TESOL (teaching English to speakers of other languages) is used in American English to include both TEFL and TESL. This is also the case in Canada as well as in Australia and New Zealand. British English uses ELT (English language teaching), because TESOL has a different, more specific meaning; see above.

== Difficulties for learners ==
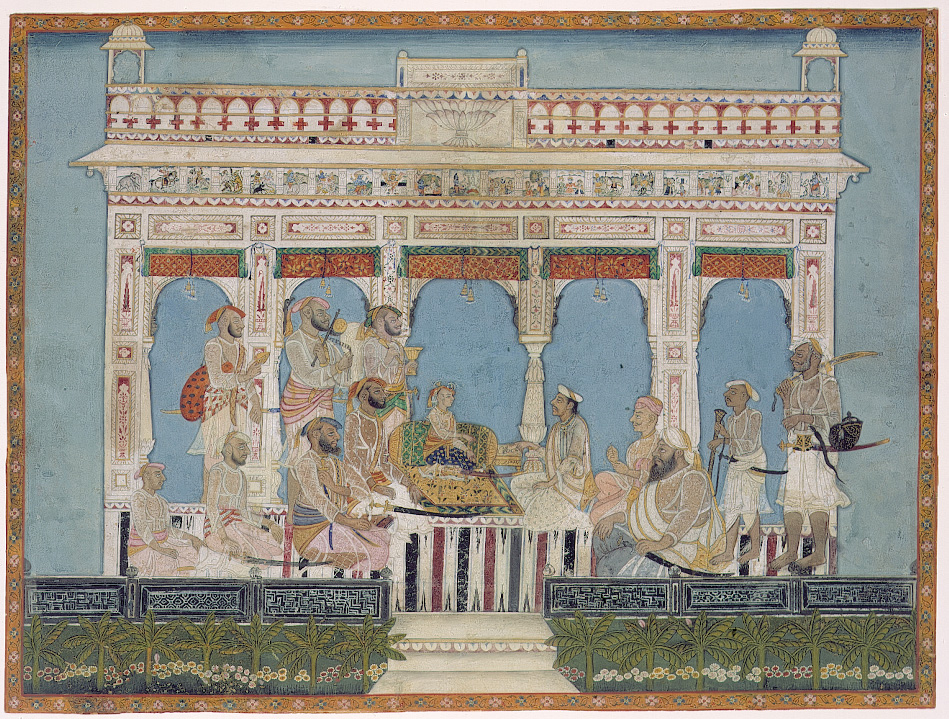
Young Jayaji Rao Sindhia, Maharaja of Gwalior, studying English, 1846

Language teaching practice often assumes that most of the difficulties that learners face in the study of English are the consequence of the degree to which their native language differs from English (a contrastive analysis approach). A native speaker of Chinese, for example, may face many more difficulties than a native speaker of German, because German and English share a Latin alphabet whereas Chinese has a character writing system among other oral, phonetic and gramatic language differences. This may be true for anyone of any mother tongue (also called the first language, normally abbreviated L1) setting out to learn any other language (called a target language, second language or L2). See also second-language acquisition (SLA) for mixed evidence from linguistic research.

Language learners often produce errors of syntax, vocabulary, and pronunciation thought to result from the influence of their L1, such as mapping its grammatical patterns inappropriately onto the L2, pronouncing certain sounds incorrectly or with difficulty, and confusing items of vocabulary known as false friends. This is known as L1 transfer or "language interference". However, these transfer effects are typically stronger for beginners' language production, and SLA research has highlighted many errors which cannot be attributed to the L1, as they are attested in learners of many language backgrounds (for example, failure to apply 3rd person present singular -s to verbs, as in 'he make' not 'he makes').

Some students may have problems due to certain words being usable, unchanged, as different parts of speech. For example, the word "suffering" in "I am suffering terribly" is a verb, but in "My suffering is terrible" is a noun, and confounding matters is the fact that both of these sentences express the same idea, using the same words. Other students might have problems due to the prescribing and proscribing nature of rules in the language formulated by amateur grammarians rather than ascribing to the functional and descriptive nature of languages evidenced from distribution. For example, a cleric, Robert Lowth, introduced the rule to never end a sentence with a preposition, inspired by Latin grammar, through his book A Short Introduction to English Grammar. The inconsistencies brought from Latin language standardization of English language led to classifying and sub-classifying an otherwise simple language structure. Like many alphabetic writing systems, English has also incorporated the principle that graphemic units should correspond to the phonemic units; however, the fidelity to the principle is compromised, compared to an exemplar language like the Finnish language. This is evident in the Oxford English Dictionary; for many years it experimented with various spellings of 'SIGN' to attain a fidelity with the said principle, among which were SINE, SEGN, and SYNE, and through the diachronic mutations eventually settled on SIGN. Cultural differences in communication styles and preferences are also significant. For example, a study among Chinese ESL students revealed that preference for not using the tense marking on verb present in the morphology of their mother tongue made it difficult for them to express time-related sentences in English. Another study looked at Chinese ESL students and British teachers and found that the Chinese learners did not see classroom 'discussion and interaction' type of communication for learning as important but placed a heavy emphasis on teacher-directed lectures.

=== Pronunciation ===
English contains a number of sounds and sound distinctions not present in some other languages. These sounds can include vowels and consonants, as well as diphthongs and other morphemes. Speakers of languages without these sounds may have problems both with hearing and pronouncing them. For example:

- The interdentals, /θ/ ('three') and /ð/ ('thee'), both written as th, are relatively rare in other languages.
- Phonemic contrast of /i/ with /ɪ/ (beat vs bit vowels), of /u/ with /ʊ/ (fool vs full vowels), and of /ɛ/ with /æ/ (bet vs bat vowels) is rare outside northwestern Europe, so unusual mergers or exotic pronunciations such as [bet] for bit may arise. Note that [bɪt] is a pronunciation often used in England and Wales for bet, and also in some dialects of American English. See Northern Cities Vowel Shift, and pin–pen merger.
- Native speakers of Japanese, Korean, and most Chinese dialects have difficulty distinguishing /r/ and /l/, as do speakers of certain Caribbean Spanish dialects when these sounds are at the ends of syllables, a phenomenon known as lambdacism, which is one form of lallation.
- Native speakers of Brazilian Portuguese, Spanish or Galician, and Ukrainian may pronounce [h]-like sounds where a /r/, /s/, or /ɡ/, respectively, would be expected, as those sounds often or almost always follow this process in their native languages, what is known as debuccalization.
- Native speakers of Arabic, Tagalog, Japanese, Korean, and important dialects of all current Iberian Romance languages (including most of Spanish) have difficulty distinguishing [b] and [v], what is known as betacism.
- Native speakers of almost all of Brazilian Portuguese, of some African Portuguese registers, of Portuguese-derived creole languages, some dialects of Swiss German, and several pontual processes in several Slavic languages, such as Bulgarian and Ukrainian, and many dialects of other languages, have instances of /l/ or /ɫ/ always becoming [w] at the end of a syllable in a given context, so that milk may be variously pronounced as [mɪu̯k], [mɪʊ̯k], or [mɪo̯k]. This is present in some English registers — known as l-vocalization — but may be shunned as substandard or bring confusion in others.
- Native speakers of many widely spoken languages (including Dutch and all the Romance ones) distinguish voiceless stop pairs /p/, /t/, /k/ from their voiced counterparts /b/, /d/, /ɡ/ merely by their sound (and in Iberian Romance languages, the latter trio does not even need to be stopped, so its native speakers unconsciously pronounce them as [β], [ð], and [ɣ ~ ɰ] — voiced fricatives or approximants in the very same mouth positions — instead much or most of the time, that native English speakers may erroneously interpret as the /v/ or /w/, /ð/ and /h/, /w/, or /r/ of their language). In English, German, Danish, and some other languages, though, the main distinguishing feature in the case of initial or stressed stopped voiceless consonants from their voiced counterparts is that they are aspirated [pʰ tʰ kʰ] (unless if immediately preceded or followed by /s/), while the voiced ones are not. As a result, much of the non-English /p/, /t/ and /k/ will sound to native English ears as /b/, /d/ and /ɡ/ instead (i.e. parking may sound more like barking).
- Ukrainian, Turkish and Azeri speakers may have trouble distinguishing between /v/ and /w/ as both pronunciations are used interchangeably for the letter v in those languages.

Languages may also differ in syllable structure; English allows for a cluster of up to three consonants before the vowel and five after it (e.g. strengths, straw, desks, glimpsed, sixths). Japanese and Brazilian Portuguese, for example, broadly alternate consonant and vowel sounds so learners from Japan and Brazil often force vowels between the consonants (e.g. desks becomes [desukusu] or [dɛskis], and milk shake becomes [miɽukuɕeːku] or [miwki ɕejki], respectively). Similarly, in most Iberian dialects, while a word can begin with [s], and within a word [s] can be followed by a consonant, a word can never both begin with [s] and be immediately followed by a consonant, so learners whose mother tongue is in this language family often have a vowel in front of the word (e.g. school becomes [eskul], [iskuɫ ~ iskuw], [ɯskuɫ] or [əskuɫ] for native speakers of Spanish, Brazilian and European Portuguese, and Catalan, respectively).

=== Grammar ===
International students typically exhibit a positive attitude toward learning English. This positive outlook persists across genders. Education in non-English-speaking countries usually focuses on grammar. English is introduced as a compulsory subject beginning in the first grades in these countries. However, despite the widespread implementation of English education, disparities exist in the quality of instruction across different types of schools. Consequently, these variations in educational quality have resulted in a gap in English proficiency among students from various regions.

- Tense, aspect, and mood – English has a relatively large number of tense–aspect–mood forms with some quite subtle differences, such as the difference between the simple past "I ate" and the present perfect "I have eaten". Progressive and perfect progressive forms add complexity. (See English verbs.)
- Functions of auxiliaries – Learners of English tend to find it difficult to manipulate the various ways in which English uses auxiliary verbs. These include negation (e.g. "He hasn't been drinking."), inversion with the subject to form a question (e.g. Has he been drinking?), short answers (e.g. Yes, he has.) and tag questions (has he?). A further complication is that the dummy auxiliary verb do/does/did is added to fulfil these functions in the simple present and simple past, but not to replace the verb to be (He drinks too much./Does he? but He is an addict/Is he?).
- Modal verbs – English has several modal auxiliary verbs, each with a number of uses. These verbs convey a special sense or mood such as obligation, necessity, ability, probability, permission, possibility, prohibition, or intention. These include "must", "can", "have to", "need to", "will", "shall", "ought to", "will have to", "may", and "might".

For example, the opposite of "You must be here at 8" (obligation) is usually "You don't have to be here at 8" (lack of obligation, choice). "Must" in "You must not drink the water" (prohibition) has a different meaning from "must" in "You must have eaten the chocolate" (deduction). This complexity takes considerable work for most English language learners to master.

All these modal verbs or "modals" take the first form of the verb after them. These modals (most of them) do not have past or future inflection, i.e. they do not have past or future tense (exceptions being have to and need to).

- Idiomatic usage – English is reputed to have a relatively high degree of idiomatic usage. For example, the use of different main verb forms in such apparently parallel constructions as "try to learn", "help learn", and "avoid learning" poses difficulty for learners. Another example is the idiomatic distinction between "make" and "do": "make a mistake", not "do a mistake"; and "do a favor", not "make a favor".
- Articles – English has two forms of article: the (the definite article) and a and an (the indefinite article). In addition, at times English nouns can or indeed must be used without an article; this is called the zero article. Some of the differences between definite, indefinite, and zero articles are fairly easy to learn, but others are not, particularly since a learner's native language may lack articles, have only one form, or use them differently from English. Although the information conveyed by articles is rarely essential for communication, English uses them frequently (several times in the average sentence) so that they require some effort from the learner.

=== Vocabulary ===
- Phrasal verbs – Phrasal verbs (also known as multiple-word verbs) in English can cause difficulties for many learners because of their syntactic pattern and because they often have several meanings. There are also a number of phrasal verb differences between American and British English.
- Prepositions – As with many other languages, the correct use of prepositions in the English language is difficult to learn, and it can turn out to be quite a frustrating learning experience for ESL/EFL learners. For example, the prepositions on (rely on, fall on), of (think of, because of, in the vicinity of), and at (turn at, meet at, start at) are used in so many different ways and contexts, it is very difficult to remember the exact meaning for each one. Furthermore, the same words are often used as adverbs (come in, press on, listen in, step in) as part of a compound verb (make up, give up, get up, give in, turn in, put on), or in more than one way with different functions and meanings (look up, look on, give in) (He looked up her skirt/He looked up the spelling/Things are looking up/When you're in town, look me up!; He gave in his homework/First he refused but then he gave in; He got up at 6 o'clock/He got up the hill/He got up a nativity play). Also, for some languages, such as Spanish, there is/are one/some prepositions that can mean multiple English prepositions (i.e. en in Spanish can mean on, in, or at). When translating back to the ESL learners' respective L1, a particular preposition's translation may be correct in one instance, but when using the preposition in another sense, the meaning is sometimes quite different. "One of my friends" translates to (transliterated) wahed min isdiqa'i in Arabic. Min is the Arabic word for "from", so it means one "from" my friends. "I am on page 5" translates to ich bin auf Seite 5 in German just fine, but in Arabic it is Ana fee safha raqm 5 (I am "in" page 5).
- Word formation – Word formation in English requires much rote learning. For example, an adjective can be negated by using the prefixes un- (e.g. unable), in- (e.g. inappropriate), dis- (e.g. dishonest), non- (non-standard) or a- (e.g. amoral), as well as several rarer prefixes.
- Size of lexicon – The history of English has resulted in a very large vocabulary, including one stream from Old English and one from the Norman infusion of Latin-derived terms. (Schmitt & Marsden claim that English has one of the largest vocabularies of any known language.) One estimate of the lexicon puts English at around 250,000 unique words. This requires more work for a learner to master the language.
- Collocations – Collocation in English is the tendency for words to occur together with others. For example, nouns and verbs that go together ("ride a bike" or "drive a car"). Native speakers tend to use chunks of collocations and ESL learners make mistakes with collocations.
- Slang and colloquialisms – In most native English-speaking countries, many slang and colloquial terms are used in everyday speech. Many learners may find that classroom based English is significantly different from how English is usually spoken in practice. This can often be difficult and confusing for learners with little experience of using English in Anglophone countries. Also, slang terms differ greatly between different regions and can change quickly in response to popular culture. Some phrases can become unintentionally rude if misused.
- Silent letters - Within English, almost every letter has the 'opportunity' to be silent in a word, except F, J, Q, R, V, and Y. The most common is e, usually at the end of the word and used to elongate the previous vowel(s). The common usage of silent letters can throw off how ESL learners interpret the language (especially those who are fluent in another Germanic language), since a common step to learning words in most languages is to pronounce them phonetically. Words such as queue, Colonel, knight and Wednesday tend to throw off the learner, since they contain large amounts of silent letters.

=== First-language literacy ===
Learners who have had less than eight years of formal education in their first language are sometimes called adult ESL literacy learners. Usually, these learners have had their first-language education interrupted. Many of these learners require a different level of support, teaching approaches and strategies, and a different curriculum from mainstream adult ESL learners. For example, these learners may lack study skills and transferable language skills, and these learners may avoid reading or writing. Often these learners do not start classroom tasks immediately, do not ask for help, and often assume the novice role when working with peers. Generally, these learners may lack self-confidence. For some, prior schooling is equated with status, cultured, civilized, high class, and they may experience shame among peers in their new ESL classes.

=== Second-language literacy ===
Learners who have not had extensive exposure to reading and writing in a second language, despite having acceptable spoken proficiency, may have difficulties with the reading and writing in their L2. Joann Crandall (1993) has pointed out that most teacher training programs for TESOL instructors do not include sufficient, in most cases "no", training for the instruction in literacy. This is a gap that many scholars feel needs to be addressed.

=== Importance of reading in ESL instruction ===
According to some English professionals, reading for pleasure is an important component in the teaching of both native and foreign languages:

"Studies that sought to improve writing by providing reading experiences in place of grammar study or additional writing practice found that these experiences were as beneficial as, or more beneficial than, grammar study or extra writing practice."

Reading bilingual or code-switched texts can be valuable in ESL instruction. Scholars such as Lourdes Torres argue that texts incorporating code-switching like authors such as Gloria Anzaldúa, Sandra Cisneros, or Junot Díaz, who are known for blending English and Spanish in their work, help reflect the linguistic realities of bilingual individuals. Their findings highlight how code-switching is used as a literary and cultural strategy that validates bilingual identity and engages readers who navigate between languages.

=== Differences between spoken and written English ===
As with most languages, written language tends to use a more formal register than spoken language.

- Spelling and pronunciation: probably the biggest difficulty for non-native speakers, since the relation between English spelling and pronunciation does not follow the alphabetic principle consistently. Because of the many changes in pronunciation which have occurred since a written standard developed, the retention of many historical idiosyncrasies in spelling, and the large influx of foreign words (mainly from Norman French, Classical Latin and Greek) with different and overlapping spelling patterns, English spelling and pronunciation are difficult even for native speakers to master. This difficulty is shown in such activities as spelling bees. The generalizations that exist are quite complex and there are many exceptions, leading to a considerable amount of rote learning. The spelling and pronunciation system causes problems in both directions: a learner may know a word by sound but be unable to write it correctly (or indeed find it in a dictionary) or they may see a word written but not know how to pronounce it or mislearn the pronunciation. However, despite the variety of spelling patterns in English, there are dozens of rules that are 75% or more reliable.

There is also debate about "meaning-focused" learning and "correction-focused" learning. Supporters for the former think that using speech as the way to explain meaning is more important. However, supporters of the latter do not agree with that and instead think that grammar and correct habit is more important.

=== Technology ===
- Technology plays an integral part in our lives and has become a major instrument in the field of education. Educational technologies make learning and teaching of English language more convenient and enable new opportunities. The video talks about the history of technology in education and its current integration in learning. Computers have made an entry into education in the past decades and have brought significant benefits to teachers and students alike. Computers help learners by making them more responsible for their own learning. Studies have shown that one of the best ways of improving one's learning ability is to use a computer where all the information one might need can be found. In today's developed world, a computer is one of a number of systems that help learners to improve their language. Computer Assisted Language Learning (CALL) is a system which aids learners to improve and practice language skills. It provides a stress-free environment for learners and makes them more responsible. Computers can provide help to ESL learners in many different ways such as teaching students to learn a new language. The computer can be used to test students about the language they already learn. It can assist them in practicing certain tasks. The computer permits students to communicate easily with other students in different places. In recent years the increasing use of mobile technology, such as smartphones and tablet computers, has led to a growing usage application created to facilitate language learning, such as The Phrasal Verbs Machine from Cambridge. In terms of online materials, there are many forms of online materials such as blogs, wikis, webquests. For instance, blogs can allow English learners to voice their opinions, sharpen their writing skills, and build their confidence. However, some who are introverted may not feel comfortable sharing their ideas on the blog. Class wikis can be used to promote collaborative learning through sharing and co-constructing knowledge. On-line materials are still just materials and thus need to be subject to the same scrutiny of evaluation as any other language material or source.
- Augmented reality (AR) is another emerging technology that has an important place in language education. It allows for merging of the virtual objects into the real world, as if they co-exist in the same time and place. The research has shown 8 benefits of AR in the educational setting: 1. Collaboration; 2. Connectivity; 3. Student centred; 4.Community; 5. Exploration; 6. Shared knowledge; 7. Multisensory experience; 8. Authenticity. Learners have mentioned that AR increased classroom engagement and student motivation. Two applications that have been tested in the ESL setting are QuiverVision and JigSpace. QuiverVision offers colouring pages that can be brought to life using Android or iOS devices. JigSpace can be a helpful resource in learning complex scientific, technical and historical concepts for ESL students.
- Increasing social nature of internet opened up new opportunities for language learners and educators. Videos, memes and chats are all sources of authentic language that are easily accessible via mobile devices or computers. Additional benefit for English language learners is that non-textual representation can be more beneficial for students with various learning preferences.
- Integration of games and gaming in language learning has recently received a surge of interest. There are games that have been specifically designed for English language learning while there are others that can be adapted to this context. Games to Learn English includes multiple games that can be played to develop language skills. Trace Effects is a game developed by U.S. Department of State which helps learners not only increase their language knowledge but also explore American culture. The most important features of gaming are their collaborative and interactive nature which makes learning engaging for learners.
- The learning ability of language learners can be more reliable with the influence of a dictionary. Learners tend to carry or are required to have a dictionary which allows them to learn independently and become more responsible for their own work. In these modern days, education has upgraded its methods of teaching and learning with dictionaries where digital materials are being applied as tools. Electronic dictionaries are increasingly a more common choice for ESL students. Most of them contain native-language equivalents and explanations, as well as definitions and example sentences in English. They can speak the English word to the learner, and they are easy to carry around. However, they are expensive and easy to lose, so students are often instructed to put their names on them.

=== Varieties of English ===
- The English language in England (and other parts of the United Kingdom) exhibits significant differences by region and class, noticeable in structure (vocabulary and grammar), accent (pronunciation) and in dialect.
- The numerous communities of English native speakers in countries all over the world also have some noticeable differences like Irish English, Australian English, Canadian English, or Newfoundland English. For instance, the following phrases only make sense in their originating cultures: toad in the hole, gulab jamun, and spotted dick.
- Attempts have been made by John Dryden and others to regulate English to conform to a specific class or community. However, English as a lingua franca has no proscribing organization that controls any prestige dialect for the language – unlike the French Academie de la langue française, Spain's Real Academia Española, or Esperanto's Akademio – and so is not racialized.

Teaching English, therefore, involves not only helping the student to use the form of English most suitable for their purposes, but also exposure to regional forms and cultural styles so that the student will be able to discern meaning even when the words, grammar, or pronunciation are different from the form of English they are being taught to speak. Some professionals in the field have recommended incorporating information about non-standard forms of English in ESL programs. For example, in advocating for classroom-based instruction in African-American English (also known as Ebonics), linguist Richard McDorman has argued, "Simply put, the ESL syllabus must break free of the longstanding intellectual imperiousness of the standard to embrace instruction that encompasses the many "Englishes" that learners will encounter and thereby achieve the culturally responsive pedagogy so often advocated by leaders in the field."

== Social challenges and benefits ==
=== Class placement ===
ESL students often suffer from the effects of tracking and ability grouping. Students are often placed into low ability groups based on scores on standardized tests in English and math. There is also low mobility among these students from low to high performing groups, which can prevent them from achieving the same academic progress as native speakers. Similar tests are also used to place ESL students in college-level courses. Students have voiced frustration that only non-native students have to prove their language skills, when being a native speaker in no way guarantees college-level academic literacy. Studies have shown that these tests can cause different passing rates among linguistic groups regardless of high school preparation.

In Canada, ESL students are generally designed for those from immigrant households who were raised in non-English speaking homes. Provincial education guidelines across the country commonly use this criterion to determine eligibility for support. The purpose of the program is to support children who struggle with English, but has been critiqued for its categorization for qualification into the program. This vague categorization of minority students who do not speak English within their homes creates a space for further marginalization.

=== Dropout rates ===
Dropout rates for ESL students in multiple countries are much higher than dropout rates for native speakers. The National Center for Education Statistics (NCES) in the United States reported that the percentage of dropouts in the non-native born Hispanic youth population between the ages of 16 and 24 years old is 43.4%. A study in Canada found that the high school dropout rate for all ESL students was 74%. High dropout rates are thought to be due to difficulties ESL students have in keeping up in mainstream classes, the increasing number of ESL students who enter middle or high school with interrupted prior formal education, and accountability systems.

The accountability system in the US is due to the No Child Left Behind Act. Schools that risk losing funding, closing, or having their principals fired if test scores are not high enough begin to view students that do not perform well on standardized tests as liabilities. Because dropouts actually increase a school's performance, critics claim that administrators let poor performing students slip through the cracks. A study of Texas schools operating under No Child Left Behind found that 80% of ESL students did not graduate from high school in five years.

=== Access to higher education ===
ESL students face several barriers to higher education. Most colleges and universities require four years of English in high school. In addition, most colleges and universities only accept one year of ESL English. It is difficult for ESL students that arrive in the United States relatively late to finish this requirement because they must spend a longer time in ESL English classes in high school, or they might not arrive early enough to complete four years of English in high school. This results in many ESL students not having the correct credits to apply for college, or enrolling in summer school to finish the required courses.

Even after overcoming credit and admission barriers, multilingual students in college often face additional challenges in writing-intensive courses. For example, Scholar Sara P. Alvarez highlights that these students are evaluated by academic English standards that do not account for their full linguistic abilities. The different perspectives challenge institutions to move beyond simply granting access to ESL students and toward creating equitable learning environments that support their academic success and identity as writers.

ESL students can also face additional financial barriers to higher education because of their language skills. Those that don't place high enough on college placement exams often have to enroll in ESL courses at their universities. These courses can cost up to $1,000 extra, and can be offered without credit towards graduation. This adds additional financial stress on ESL students that often come from families of lower socioeconomic status. The latest statistics show that the median household income for school-age ESL students is $36,691 while that of non-ESL students is $60,280. College tuition has risen sharply in the last decade, while family income has fallen. In addition, while many ESL students receive a Pell Grant, the maximum grant for the year 2011–2012 covered only about a third of the cost of college.

=== Interaction with native speakers ===
ESL students often have difficulty interacting with native speakers in school. Some ESL students avoid interactions with native speakers because of their frustration or embarrassment at their poor English. Immigrant students often also lack knowledge of popular culture, which limits their conversations with native speakers to academic topics. In classroom group activities with native speakers, ESL students often do not participate, again because of embarrassment about their English, but also because of cultural differences: their native cultures may value silence and individual work at school in preference to social interaction and talking in class.

These interactions have been found to extend to teacher-student interactions as well. In most mainstream classrooms, a teacher-led discussion is the most common form of lesson. In this setting, some ESL students will fail to participate, and often have difficulty understanding teachers because they talk too fast, do not use visual aids, or use native colloquialisms. ESL students also have trouble getting involved with extracurricular activities with native speakers for similar reasons. Students fail to join extra-curricular activities because of the language barrier, the cultural emphasis of academics over other activities, or failure to understand traditional pastimes in their new country.

=== Social benefits ===
Supporters of ESL programs claim they play an important role in the formation of peer networks and adjustment to school and society in their new homes. Having class among other students learning English as a second language relieves the pressure of making mistakes when speaking in class or to peers. ESL programs also allow students to be among others who appreciate their native language and culture, the expression of which is often not supported or encouraged in mainstream settings. ESL programs also allow students to meet and form friendships with other non-native speakers from different cultures, promoting racial tolerance and multiculturalism.

=== Controversy over ethical administration of ESL programs ===
ESL programs have been critiqued for focusing more on revenue-generation than on educating students. This has led to controversy over how ESL programs can be managed in an ethical manner.

=== Professional and technical communication advocacy ===
The field of technical and professional communication has the potential to disrupt barriers that hinder ESL learners from entering the field, although it can just as easily perpetuate these issues. One study by Matsuda & Matsuda sought to evaluate introductory-level textbooks on the subject of technical communication. Among their research, they found that these textbooks perpetuated the "myth of linguistic homogeneity—the tacit and widespread acceptance of the dominant image of composition students as native speakers of a privileged variety of English." While the textbooks were successful in referencing global and international perspectives, the portrayal of the intended audience, the you of the text, ultimately alienated any individual not belonging to a predominantly white background and culture. In constructing this guise, prospective ESL learners are collectively lumped into an "other" group that isolates and undermines their capacity to enter the field.

Furthermore, this alienation is exacerbated by the emergence of English as the pinnacle language for business and many professional realms. In Kwon & Klassen's research, they also identified and criticized a "single native-speaker recipe for linguistic success," which contributed to anxieties about entering the professional field for ESL technical communicators. These concerns about an English-dominated professional field indicate an affective filter that provides a further barrier to social justice for these ESL individuals. These misconceptions and anxieties point towards an issue of exclusivity that technical and professional communicators must address. This social justice concern becomes an ethical concern as well, with all individuals deserving usable, accessible, and inclusive information.

There is a major concern about the lack of accessibility to translation services and the amount of time and attention their English proficiency is given throughout their educational experiences. If a student lacks an understanding of the English language and still needs to participate in their coursework, they will turn to translations in order to aid their efforts. The issue is that many of these translations rarely carry the same meaning as the original text. The students in this study said that a translated text is "pretty outdated, covers only the basics or is terribly translated," and that "The technical vocabulary linked to programming can be complicated to assimilate, especially in the middle of explanatory sentences if you don't know the equivalent word in your native language." Students can't be proficient in their given subjects if the language barrier is complicating the message. Researchers found that syntax, semantics, style, etc., scramble up the original messages. This disorientation of the text fogs up the message and makes it difficult for the student to decipher what they are supposed to be learning. This is where additional time and attention are needed to bridge the gap between native English speakers and ESL students. ESL students face difficulties in areas concerning lexico-grammatical aspects of technical writing., overall textual organization and comprehension, differentiation between genres of technical communication and the social hierarchies that concern the subject matter. This inhibits their ability to comprehend complex messages from English texts, and it would be more beneficial for them to tackle these subjects individually. The primary issue with this is the accessibility to more instruction. ESL students need an individual analysis of their needs and this needs to revolve around the student's ability to communicate and interpret information in English. Due to the civil rights decision of Lauv v. Nichols school districts are required to provide this additional instruction based on the needs of students, but this requirement still needs to be acted on.

Many ESL students have issues in higher-level courses that hinder their academic performances due to the complicated language used in these courses being at a more complex level than what many ESL students were taught. In many cases of ESL students learning Computer Programming, they struggle with the language used in instructional manuals. Writing media centers have caused ESL students issues with universities unable to provide proofreading in their writing media center programs. This causes many ESL students to have difficulties writing papers for high-level courses that require a more complex lexicon than what many of them were taught. Fortunately, university tutors have had successes with teaching ESL students how to write a more technically complex language that ESL students need to know for their courses, but it raises the question of if ESL learners need to know a more complex version of the English language to succeed in their professional careers.

== Peer tutoring for ESL students ==
Peer tutoring refers to an instructional method that pairs up low-achieving English readers, with ESL students that know minimal English and who are also approximately the same age and same grade level. The goal of this dynamic is to help both the tutor, in this case, the English speaker, and the tutee, the ESL student. Monolingual tutors are given the class material in order to provide tutoring to their assigned ESL tutee. Once the tutor has had the chance to help the student, classmates get to switch roles in order to give both peers an opportunity to learn from each other. In a study, which conducted a similar research, their results indicated that low-achieving readers that were chosen as tutors, made a lot of progress by using this procedure. In addition, ESL students were also able to improve their grades due to the fact that they increased their approach in reading acquisition skills.

=== Importance ===
Since there is not enough funding to afford tutors, and teachers find it hard to educate all students who have different learning abilities, it is highly important to implement peer-tutoring programs in schools. Students placed in ESL program learn together along with other non-English speakers; however, by using peer tutoring in a classroom it will avoid the separation between regular English classes and ESL classes. These programs will promote community between students that will be helping each other grow academically. To further support this statement, a study researched the effectiveness of peer tutoring and explicit teaching in classrooms. It was found that students with learning disabilities and low performing students who are exposed to the explicit teaching and peer tutoring treatment in the classroom, have better academic performance than those students who do not receive this type of assistance. It was proven that peer tutoring is the most effective and no cost form of teaching

=== Benefits ===
It has been proven that peer-mediated tutoring is an effective tool to help ESL students succeed academically. Peer tutoring has been utilized across many different academic courses and the outcomes for those students that have different learning abilities are outstanding. Classmates who were actively involved with other peers in tutoring had better academic standing than those students who were not part of the tutoring program. Based on their results, researchers found that all English student learners were able to maintain a high percentage of English academic words on weekly tests taught during a tutoring session. It was also found that the literature on the efficacy of peer tutoring service combined with regular classroom teaching, is the best methodology practice that is effective, that benefits students, teachers, and parents involved.

=== Research on peer English immersion tutoring ===
Similarly, a longitudinal study was conducted to examine the effects of the paired bilingual program and an English-only reading program with Spanish speaking English learners in order to increase students' English reading outcomes. Students whose primary language was Spanish and were part of the ESL program were participants of this study. Three different approaches were the focus in which immersing students in English from the very beginning and teaching them reading only in that language; teaching students in Spanish first, followed by English; and teaching students to read in Spanish and English simultaneously. This occurs through a strategic approach such as structured English immersion or sheltered instruction.

Findings showed that the paired bilingual reading approach appeared to work as well as, or better than, the English-only reading approach in terms of reading growth and results. Researchers found differences in results, but they also varied based on several outcomes depending on the student's learning abilities and academic performance.

=== ESL teachers' training ===
Teachers in an ESL class are specifically trained in particular techniques and tools to help students learn English. Research says that the quality of their teaching methods is what matters the most when it comes to educating English learners. It was also mentioned how it is highly important for teachers to have the drive to help these students succeed and "feel personal responsibility." It is important to highlight the idea that the school system needs to focus on school-wide interventions in order to make an impact and be able to help all English learners. There is a high need for comprehensive professional development for teachers in the ESL program.

=== Effects of peer tutoring on the achievement gap ===
Although peer tutoring has been proven to be an effective way of learning that engages and promotes academic achievement in students, does it have an effect on the achievement gap? It is an obvious fact that there is a large academic performance disparity between White, Black, and Latino students, and it continues to be an issue that has to be targeted. In an article, it was mentioned that no one has been able to identify the true factors that cause this discrepancy. However, it was mentioned that by developing effective peer tutoring programs in schools could be a factor that can potentially decrease the achievement gap in the United States.

== Exams for learners ==
Learners of English are often eager to get accreditation and a number of exams are known internationally:

- IELTS (International English Language Testing System) is the world's most popular English test for higher education and immigration. It is managed by the British Council, Cambridge Assessment English and IDP Education. It is offered in Academic, General and Life Skills versions. IELTS Academic is the normal test of English proficiency for entry into universities in the UK, Australia, Canada, and other British English countries. IELTS General is required for immigration into Australia and New Zealand. Both versions of IELTS are accepted for all classes of UK visa and immigration applications. IELTS Life Skills, was introduced in 2015 specifically to meet the requirements for some classes of UK visa application.
- CaMLA, a collaboration between the University of Michigan and Cambridge English Language Assessment offer a suite of American English tests, including the MET (Michigan English Test), the MTELP Series (Michigan Test of English Language Proficiency), MELAB (Michigan English Language Assessment Battery), CaMLA EPT (English Placement Test), YLTE (Young Learners Test of English), ECCE and ECPE.
- TOEFL (Test of English as a Foreign Language), an Educational Testing Service product, developed and used primarily for academic institutions in the US, and now widely accepted in tertiary institutions in Canada, New Zealand, Australia, the UK, Japan, South Korea, and Ireland. The current test is an Internet-based test and is thus known as the TOEFL iBT. Used as a proxy for English for Academic Purposes.
- iTEP (International Test of English Proficiency), developed by former ELS Language Centers President Perry Akins' Boston Educational Services, and used by colleges and universities such as the California State University system. iTEP Business is used by companies, organizations, and governments, and iTEP SLATE (Secondary Level Assessment Test of English) is designed for middle and high school-age students.
- PTE Academic (Pearson Test of English Academic), a Pearson product, measures reading, writing, speaking and listening as well as grammar, oral fluency, pronunciation, spelling, vocabulary and written discourse. The test is computer-based and is designed to reflect international English for academic admission into any university requiring English proficiency.
- TOEIC (Test of English for International Communication), an Educational Testing Service product for Business English used by 10,000 organizations in 120 countries. Includes a listening and reading test as well as a speaking and writing test introduced in selected countries beginning in 2006.
- Trinity College London ESOL offers the Integrated Skills in English (ISE) series of 5 exams which assesses reading, writing, speaking and listening and is accepted by academic institutions in the UK. They also offer Graded Examinations in Spoken English (GESE), a series of 12 exams, which assesses speaking and listening, and ESOL Skills for Life and ESOL for Work exams in the UK only.
- Cambridge Assessment English offers a suite of globally available examinations including General English: Key English Test (KET), Preliminary English Test (PET), First Certificate in English (FCE), Certificate in Advanced English (CAE) and Certificate of Proficiency in English (CPE).
- London Tests of English from Pearson Language Tests, a series of six exams each mapped to a level from the Common European Framework (CEFR) – see below.
- Secondary Level English Proficiency test
- MTELP (Michigan Test of English Language Proficiency), is a language certificate measuring a student's English ability as a second or foreign language. Its primary purpose is to assess a learner's English language ability at an academic or advanced business level.

Many countries also have their own exams. ESOL learners in England, Wales, and Northern Ireland usually take the national Skills for Life qualifications, which are offered by several exam boards. EFL learners in China may take the College English Test, the Test for English Majors (TEM), and/or the Public English Test System (PETS). People in Taiwan often take the General English Proficiency Test (GEPT). In Greece, English students may take the PALSO (PanHellenic Association of Language School Owners) exams.

=== The Common European Framework ===
Between 1998 and 2000, the Council of Europe's language policy division developed its Common European Framework of Reference for Languages. The aim of this framework was to have a common system for foreign language testing and certification, to cover all European languages and countries.

The Common European Framework (CEF) divides language learners into three levels:

- A. Basic User
- B. Independent User
- C. Proficient User

Each of these levels is divided into two sections, resulting in a total of six levels for testing (A1, A2, B1, etc.).

This table compares ELT exams according to the CEF levels:

ELT exam	CEF level					
ELT exam	C2	C1	B2	B1	A2	A1
ALTE	Level 5	Level 4	Level 3	Level 2	Level 1	Breakthrough
RQF	Level 3	Level 2	Level 1	Entry 3	Entry 2	Entry 1
PTE General	Level 5	Level 4	Level 3	Level 2	Level 1	Level A1
Trinity College London ESOL
GESE	Grade 12	Grade 10, 11	Grade 7, 8, 9	Grade 5, 6	Grades 3, 4	Grade 2
ISE	ISE IV	ISE III	ISE II	ISE I	ISE 0	n/a
UBELT exam	4.0–5.0	3.0–3.5	2.0–2.5	1.5	1.0	<1.0
IELTS	8.5–9.0	7.0–8.0	5.5–6.5	4.0–5.0	n/a	n/a
Cambridge English Language Assessment
BULATS	90–100	75–89	60–74	40–59	20–39	0-19
BEC	n/a	Higher	Vantage	Preliminary	n/a	n/a
General	CPE	CAE	FCE	PET	KET	n/a
YLE	n/a	n/a	n/a	n/a	Flyers	Movers
Skills for Life	n/a	Level 2	Level 1	Entry 3	Entry 2	Entry 1
CaMLA	ECPE	MET, MELAB	MET, MELAB, ECCE	MET, MELAB	MET, YLTE	YLTE

== Qualifications for teachers ==
Qualifications vary from one region or jurisdiction to the next. There are also different qualifications for those who manage or direct TESOL programs

=== Non-native speakers ===
Most people who teach English are in fact not native speakers. They are state school teachers in countries around the world, and as such, they hold the relevant teaching qualification of their country, usually with a specialization in teaching English. For example, teachers in Hong Kong hold the Language Proficiency Assessment for Teachers. Those who work in private language schools may, from commercial pressures, have the same qualifications as native speakers (see below). Widespread problems exist of minimal qualifications and poor-quality providers of training, and as the industry becomes more professional, it is trying to self-regulate to eliminate these.

=== Qualifications by country ===
==== Australia ====
The Australian Skills Quality Authority accredits vocational TESOL qualifications such as the 10695NAT Certificate IV in TESOL and the 10688NAT Diploma in TESOL. As ASQA is an Australian Government accreditation authority, these qualifications rank within the Australian Qualifications Framework. And most graduates work in vocational colleges in Australia. These TESOL qualifications are also accepted internationally and recognized in countries such as Japan, South Korea, and China.

==== Canada ====
Teachers teaching adult ESL in Canada in the federally funded Language Instruction to Newcomers (LINC) program must be TESL certified. Most employers in Ontario encourage certification by TESL Ontario. Often this requires completing an eight-month graduate certificate program at an accredited university or college. See the TESL Ontario or TESL Canada websites for more information.

==== Chile ====
Native speakers will often be able to find work as an English teacher in Chile without an ESL teaching certificate. However, many private institutes give preference to teachers with a TEFL, CELTA, or TESOL certificate. The Chilean Ministry of Education also sponsors the English Opens Doors program, which recruits native English speakers to come work as teaching assistants in Chilean public schools. English Opens Doors requires only a bachelor's degree in order to be considered for acceptance.

==== United Arab Emirates ====
Native speakers must possess teacher certification in their home country in order to teach English as a foreign language in most institutions and schools in United Arab Emirates (UAE). Otherwise, CELTA/TESOL/TEFL/ Certificate or the like is required along with prior teaching experience.

==== United Kingdom ====
Common, respected qualifications for teachers within the United Kingdom's sphere of influence include certificates and diplomas issued by Trinity College London ESOL and Cambridge English Language Assessment (henceforth Trinity and Cambridge).

A certificate course is usually undertaken before starting to teach. This is sufficient for most EFL jobs and for some ESOL ones. CertTESOL (Certificate in Teaching English to Speakers of Other Languages), issued by Trinity, and CELTA (Certificate in English Language Teaching to Adults), issued by Cambridge, are the most widely taken and accepted qualifications for new teacher trainees. Courses are offered in the UK and in many countries around the world. It is usually taught full-time over a one-month period or part-time over a period of up to a year.

Teachers with two or more years of teaching experience who want to stay in the profession and advance their career prospects (including school management and teacher training) can take a diploma course. Trinity offers the Trinity Licentiate Diploma in Teaching English to Speakers of Other Languages (DipTESOL) and Cambridge offers the Diploma in English Language Teaching to Adults (DELTA). These diplomas are considered to be equivalent and are both accredited at level 7 of the revised National Qualifications Framework. Some teachers who stay in the profession go on to do an MA in a relevant discipline such as applied linguistics or ELT. Many UK master's degrees require considerable experience in the field before a candidate is accepted onto the course.

The above qualifications are well-respected within the UK EFL sector, including private language schools and higher education language provision. However, in England and Wales, in order to meet the government's criteria for being a qualified teacher of ESOL in the Learning and Skills Sector (i.e. post-compulsory or further education), teachers need to have the Certificate in Further Education Teaching Stage 3 at level 5 (of the revised NQF) and the Certificate for ESOL Subject Specialists at level 4. Recognised qualifications which confer one or both of these include a Postgraduate Certificate in Education (PGCE) in ESOL, the CELTA module 2, and City & Guilds 9488. Teachers of any subject within the British state sector are normally expected to hold a PGCE and may choose to specialise in ELT.

==== United States ====
Some U.S. instructors at community colleges, private language schools and universities qualify to teach English to adult non-native speakers by completing a Master of Arts (MA) in TESOL. Other degrees may be a Master in Adult Education and Training or Applied Linguistics. This degree also qualifies them to teach in most EFL contexts. There are also a growing number of online programs offering TESOL degrees. In fact, "the growth of Online Language Teacher Education (OLTE) programs from the mid-1990s to 2009 was from 20 to more than 120".

In many areas of the United States, a growing number of K–12 public school teachers are involved in teaching ELLs (English Language Learners, that is, children who come to school speaking a home language other than English). The qualifications for these classroom teachers vary from state to state but always include a state-issued teaching certificate for public instruction. This state licensing requires substantial practical experience as well as course work. In some states, an additional specialization in ESL/ELL is required. This may be called an "endorsement". Endorsement programs may be part of a graduate program or maybe completed independently to add the endorsement to the initial teaching certificate

An MA in TESOL may or may not meet individual state requirements for K–12 public school teachers. It is important to determine if a graduate program is designed to prepare teachers for adult education or K–12 education.

The MA in TESOL typically includes second-language acquisition theory, linguistics, pedagogy, and an internship. A program will also likely have specific classes on skills such as reading, writing, pronunciation, and grammar. Admission requirements vary and may or may not require a background in education and/or language. Many graduate students also participate in teaching practica or clinicals, which provide the opportunity to gain experience in classrooms.

In addition to traditional classroom teaching methods, speech pathologists, linguists, actors, and voice professionals are actively involved in teaching pronunciation of American English—called accent improvement, accent modification, and accent reduction—and serve as resources for other aspects of spoken English, such as word choice.

The issuance of a teaching certificate or license for K–12 teachers is not automatic following completion of degree requirements. All teachers must complete a battery of exams (typically the Praxis test or a specific state test subject and method exams or similar, state-sponsored exams) as well as supervised instruction as student teachers. Often, ESL certification can be obtained through extra college coursework. ESL certifications are usually only valid when paired with an already existing teaching certificate. Certification requirements for ESL teachers vary greatly from state to state; out-of-state teaching certificates are recognized if the two states have a reciprocity agreement.

The following document states the qualifications for an ESL certificate in the state of Pennsylvania.

== Professional associations and unions ==
- TESOL International Association (TESOL) is a professional organization based in the United States. In addition, TESOL International Association has more than 100 statewide and regional affiliates in the United States and around the world, see below.
- The International Association of Teachers of English as a Foreign Language (IATEFL) is a professional organization based in the United Kingdom.
- Professional organizations for teachers of English exist at national levels. Many contain phrases in their title such as the Japan Association for Language Teaching (JALT), TESOL Greece in Greece, or the Society of Pakistan English Language Teachers (SPELT). Some of these organizations may be bigger in structure (supra-national, such as TESOL Arabia in the Gulf states), or smaller (limited to one city, state, or province, such as CATESOL in California). Some are affiliated with TESOL or IATEFL.
- The National Association for Teaching English and other Community Languages to Adults (NATECLA) which focuses on teaching ESOL in the United Kingdom.
- National Union of General Workers is a Japanese union which includes English teachers.
- University and College Union is a British trade union which includes lecturers of ELT.

== Acronyms and abbreviations ==
Note that some of the terms below may be restricted to one or more countries, or may be used with different meanings in different countries, particularly the US and UK. See further discussion is Terminology, and types above.

=== Types of English ===
- 1-to-1 – One to one lesson
- BE – Business English
- EAL – English as an additional language
- EAP – English for academic purposes
- EFL – English as a foreign language
- EE – Extramural English
- EIL – English as an international language (see main article at International English)
- ELF – English as a lingua franca, a common language that is not the mother tongue of any of the participants in a discussion
- ELL – English language learner
- ELT – English language teaching
- ESL – English as a second language
- ESOL – English for speakers of other languages
- ESP – English for specific purposes, or English for special purposes (e.g. technical English, scientific English, English for medical professionals, English for waiters)
- EST – English for science and technology (e.g. technical English, scientific English)
- TEFL – Teaching English as a second or foreign language. This link is to a page about a subset of TEFL, namely travel-teaching. More generally, see the discussion in Terminology and types.
- TESL – Teaching English as a second language
- TESOL – Teaching English to speakers of other languages, or Teaching English as a second or other languages. Also the short name for TESOL International Association.
- TYLE – Teaching Young Learners English. Note that "Young Learners" can mean under 18, or much younger.

=== Other abbreviations ===
- BULATS – Business Language Testing Services, a computer-based test of business English, produced by CambridgeEsol. The test also exists for French, German, and Spanish.
- CELT – Certificate in English Language Teaching, certified by the National Qualifications Authority of Ireland (ACELS).
- CELTA – Certificate in English Language Teaching to Adults
- CELTYL – Certificate in English Language Teaching to Young Learners
- Delta – Diploma in English Language Teaching to Adults
- ECPE – Examination for the Certificate of Proficiency in English
- IELTS – International English Language Testing System
- LTE – London Tests of English by Pearson Language Tests
- OLTE – Online Language Teacher Education
- TOEFL – Test of English as a Foreign Language
- TOEIC – Test of English for International Communication
- UCLES – University of Cambridge Local Examinations Syndicate, an exam board
- ELICOS – English Language Intensive Courses for Overseas Students, commonly used in Australia

== See also ==
- Spanish as a second or foreign language

=== Language terminology ===
- Foreign language
- Glossary of language teaching terms and ideas
- Second language
- Basic English

=== General language teaching and learning ===
- Applied linguistics
- Contrastive rhetoric
- Language education
- Second-language acquisition

=== English language teaching and learning ===
- Assistant Language Teacher
- Academic English
- Non-native pronunciations of English
- Structured English Immersion, a framework for teaching English language learners in public schools
- Teaching English as a foreign language (TEFL)
- Translanguaging

=== Contemporary English ===
- Comparison of American and British English
- English language
- English studies
- International English

=== Dictionaries and resources ===
- Advanced learner's dictionary
- Foreign language writing aid

=== Statistics ===
- EF English Proficiency Index
