= Ruth Hayman =

Lawyer and anti-apartheid campaigner

- Born: February 1913; Johannesburg, South Africa
- Died: October 1981 (aged 68); London, England
- Citizenship: South Africa
- Occupation: Lawyer Activist
- Spouse: Mervyn Lazar

Ruth Hayman (1913 - 1981) was a lawyer and anti-apartheid campaigner. She was one of the first women in South Africa to qualify as an attorney. Through the Black Sash organisation, Hayman offered free legal advice to many people, usually women, who had approached the Black Sash Advice Centre in Johannesburg, and often appeared herself in court to represent them. She also defended the anti-apartheid activists Walter and Adelaine Hain, parents of the British Cabinet Minister Peter Hain.

Her activities brought her into direct opposition with the National Party government, and on 22 April 1966 she was served with a "banning order" under the Suppression of Communism Act and placed under house arrest.

"This banning was, according to Sydney Kentridge, 'inexplicable save on the assumption that it was a punishment for her professional work' ('Legal Aid and Political Trials' in Legal Aid in South Africa (1974) 215). The Transvaal Law Society refused to come to her aid. This sent out a clear message to attorneys." (Dugard, J., 2004, p508)

Hayman moved to London, with her husband, Mervyn Lazar, in 1968, and was a pioneer in the field of teaching English as a second language. In 1977 she was one of the founders of the National Association for the Teaching of English as a Second Language to Adults. Now renamed as NATECLA. The Ruth Hayman Trust, set up in her memory, gives small personal grants to support the education and training of adults who live in the United Kingdom and whose first language is not English.

She was born in Johannesburg, South Africa in February 1913, and died in London, England in October 1981.

== See also ==
- List of people subject to banning orders under apartheid
