= Contrastive rhetoric =

Study of how common languages are used among different cultures

Contrastive rhetoric is the study of how a person's first language and culture influence writing in a second language and how writing conventions are different across cultures. The term 'contrastive rhetoric' was introduced by the American applied linguist Robert Kaplan in 1966. The field was later expanded by applied linguist Ulla Connor, and other researchers. Since its inception the area of study has had a significant impact on the exploration of intercultural discourse structures that extend beyond the target language's native forms of discourse organization. The field brought attention to cultural and associated linguistic habits in expression of English language. Over time, contrastive rhetoric expanded past comparing writing patterns between languages. It has grown to examine how social contexts and purposes influence this form of communication. Researchers also began examining how writing practices vary across cultural and social contexts. This leads to broader approaches like intercultural rhetoric.

== History and development ==
Contrastive rhetoric emerged as a research area in the 1960s. In 1966, American linguist Robert B. Kaplan published Cultural Thought Patterns in Intercultural Education, which examines how culture influences the organization aspect of communication in writing. During his research, Kaplan studied differences in the ways students from different language backgrounds structured their English writing. His findings solidified the relationship between cultural patterns and second-language writing and highlighted its importance in linguistic research.

In 1996, applied linguist Ulla Connor published Contrastive Rhetoric: Cross-Cultural Aspects of Second-Language Writing, which analyzed the development of the field and its research. Connor examined how writers are influenced by their first language or culture when writing in a second language. Her work connects contrastive rhetoric to other areas of study, like genre analysis and translation. Her work helped broaden research beyond the organization of student essays to include other forms of writing.

== Trends ==
Throughout time, contrastive rhetoric has expanded past comparing writing patterns between languages and cultures. Researchers began to dive deeper by examining how writing has been influenced by social contexts, audiences and purposes. These developments has led to discovering new ways to approach research that considers cultural differences while simultaneously recognizing that writing practices can vary within cultures and communities.

=== EAP and other genres ===
First, there was a marked increase in the types of written texts considered the purview of second language writing around the world. English for Academic Purposes (EAP) classes teach other types of writing besides the student essay required in college classes. Other important genres are the academic research article, research report, and grant proposal. Writing for professional purposes, such as business, is also now considered a legitimate type of second language writing and worthy of research and teaching. Research in contrastive rhetoric has expanded to examine how writing conventions differ across academic and professional writing. Research articles, proposals, business documents, and academic essays each have different expectations for organization and audience. These differences have encouraged researchers to look further into student writing and consider how writers adapt their communication to different situations.

=== Socially situated writing ===
Second, in addition to the expansion of the genre, textual analysis has moved contrastive rhetoric to emphasize the social situation of writing. Today, writing is increasingly regarded as being socially situated; each situation may entail special consideration to audience, purposes, standards of writing quality, and correspondingly may require varying amounts of revision, collaboration, and attention to detail. The expectations and norms of discourse communities or communities of practice (cultural and disciplinary) may shape these situational expectations and practices. This is where contrastive rhetoric overlaps with social constructionism, which sees approaches to textual meaning as dynamic, socio-cognitive activities. Instead of analyzing what texts "mean", the interest is to understand how they construct meaning. Bazerman and Prior (2004, p. 6) pose three questions to guide the analysis of writing:

- "What does the text talk about?"
- "How do texts influence audiences?"
- "How do texts come into being?"

=== Critical contrastive rhetoric ===
Critical contrastive rhetoric developed in response to concerns and criticisms that challenged traditional contrastive rhetoric, about treating cultural and linguistic groups as having fixed writing patterns. Critical contrastive rhetoric explores issues such as critical thinking in teaching situations that challenge essentialism. Drawing on poststructuralist, postcolonial, and postmodern perspectives, this approach examines how language, culture, and power shape writing practices. Rather than assuming that all members of a cultural group write the same way, critical contrastive rhetoric recognizes variation within cultures and examines how broader social and political contexts affect writing and language teaching.This approach recognizes the diversity of languages, rhetorical styles, and student identities while examining how culture and power influences writing and teaching practices.

== Research methods ==
Researchers use multiple methods to examine writing across languages and cultures. Textual analysis lets researchers compare the language and organization of written texts; however, genre analysis examines how writing conventions vary by text and purpose. Corpus analysis uses collections of written texts to identify patterns in language use. Ethnographic approaches provide another perspective by examining writing within its social and cultural context, including the people and situations involved in producing texts.

=== Research examples ===
Research on Japanese and English writing has studied the differences in rhetorical expectations in acedemic writing for each language. In a 2013 article, Jim McKinley reviewed research concerning Japanese students writing in English, their second language. He discussed how expectations surrounding reader responsibility and academic argument can change the way Japanese students approach English writing. McKinley also had to consider that difficulties identified by Western instructors were reflective of differences in educational differences between cultures, and not a lack of critical thinking ability. His discussion highlights how important it is to consider cultural and educational contexts while examining second-language writing.

Research has also examined the relationship between Spanish and English writing practices. Jorge Jiménez Ramírez described an activity at the Universidad Europea de Madrid with students learning Spanish as their second language. The activity introduced the students to cultural differences in writing through the use of punctuation, for example. According to the study, students showed improvements in reading comprehension, and the quality of their work increased. This research illustrated how contrastive rhetiorc can be applied in language instruction, in order to help students recognize those differences in written communication between languages.

== Questions of Relevance ==
In the early 2000s, some postmodern and critical pedagogy writers in the second language writing field, began referring to contrastive rhetoric as if it had been frozen in space. Over the years, the term contrastive rhetoric had started to gain a negative connotation, even negatively affecting writing in a second language. Understood by many as Kaplan's original work, contrastive rhetoric was increasingly characterized as static, and linked to contrastive analysis, a movement associated with structural linguistics and behavioralism. Many of the contributions made to contrastive rhetoric from the late 1960s to the early 1990s have been ignored. In a 2002 article, Connor attempted to address these criticisms and to offer new directions for a viable contrastive rhetoric. In addressing the critiques, she aimed to draw attention to the broad scope of contrastive rhetoric and determined that a new term would better encompass the essence of contrastive rhetoric in its current state. To distinguish between the often-quoted "static" model and the new advances that have been made, Connor suggests it may be useful to begin using the term intercultural rhetoric instead of contrastive rhetoric to refer to the current models of cross-cultural research.

According to Connor, the term intercultural rhetoric better describes the broadening trends of expression across languages and cultures. It preserves the traditional approaches that use textual analysis, genre analysis, and corpus analysis, yet also introduces ethnographic approaches that examine language in interactions. Furthermore, it connotes the analysis of texts that allows for dynamic definitions of culture and the inclusion of smaller cultures (e.g., disciplinary, classroom) in the analysis.

While Connor continues to use the term intercultural rhetoric, scholars outside the United States looking at specific language differences (e.g. English and Japanese and English and Spanish) consider this to be a loaded label and continue to use the term contrastive rhetoric for the distinctiveness the theory shows and for the freedom of using tools to assess and understand the field in a non-restrictive manner.

== See also ==
- Applied linguistics
- Contrastive linguistics
- Communication accommodation theory
- Linguistic relativity
- Second language acquisition
