= Charles Carpenter Fries =

American linguist

- Born: November 29, 1887; Reading, Pennsylvania, U.S.
- Died: December 8, 1967 (aged 80); Ann Arbor, Michigan, U.S.
- Known for: Linguist, Oral Aural method

Charles Carpenter Fries (November 29, 1887 – December 8, 1967) was an American linguist and language teacher. Fries is considered the creator of the Aural-Oral method (also erroneously called the Audio-Lingual method). He believed, along with Robert Lado, that language teaching and learning should be approached in a scientific way.

Fries graduated from Bucknell University in 1909 where he also taught from 1911 to 1920, becoming a professor in 1917. Most of his career was spent lecturing at the University of Michigan (1920 and 1958). Fries was president of the National Council of Teachers of English in 1927 and 1928, president of the Linguistic Society of America in 1939, and director of the Linguistic Institute from 1936 to 1940 and from 1945 to 1947. He founded the English Language Institute at the University of Michigan and served as its director from 1941 to 1956.

Fries's chief works dealt with structural linguistics. He conducted diachronic and synchronic studies of the English language, prepared a series of English-language textbooks for foreigners, and developed what he called 'scientific principles for the study of foreign languages'. Fries was the editor of the journal Language Learning in 1948. Between 1928 and 1958, he was editor-in-chief of the Early Modern English Dictionary.

Fries wrote extensively on language teaching, including early work on Corpus linguistics, education, and linguistics.
