= Trinity College London ESOL =

Trinity College London ESOL is an international English language examinations board delivering assessments in English language learning and teaching, and has been offering English language examinations since 1938. Trinity College London's exams are taken by over 850,000 candidates in more than 60 countries each year.

Language certificates offered include English for Speakers of Other Languages (ESOL) for non-native speakers of English (learning) and Teaching English to Speakers of Other Languages (TESOL) for teachers of non-native speakers of English (teaching). Trinity College London provides the following examinations:

== Objectives ==
To provide evidence of candidates' proficiency across the four English language skills—reading, writing, speaking, and listening—candidates may use an ISE qualification. This qualification demonstrates their English language ability across the Common European Framework of Reference (CEFR) levels: A2, B1, B2, C1, and C2. ISE is suitable for any candidate (young person or adult) either within or entering an educational context. ISE has been designed to reflect the types of tasks and texts students encounter within the educational domain.

== Assessment methods ==
ISE Foundation to ISE III Reading & Writing is assessed using dichotomous scoring and rating scales. ISE Foundation to ISE III Speaking & Listening is assessed using rating scales. One Independent Listening task in ISE Foundation and ISE I is scored. The overall result for each unit is taken by converting the total score into one of the following results: Distinction - Merit - Pass - Fail. ISE IV Reading & Writing and Speaking & Listening is assessed by means of one overall criterion, Task fulfilment. This is assessed in each phase of the Interview using a four-point scale (A–D). The examiner assesses the candidate's performance in each phase of the exam by awarding a letter grade: A, B, C or D:

A — Distinction (reflects an excellent performance)

B — Merit (reflects a good performance)

C — Pass (reflects a satisfactory performance)

D — Fail (reflects an unsatisfactory performance).

== UK ESOL Examinations ==
These certificates are for ESOL learners in England, Wales and Northern Ireland, designed in accordance with the UK Adult ESOL Core Curriculum.

ESOL Skills for Life certificates
These assessments are offered in Speaking and Listening, Reading and Writing and are available from Entry 1 to Level 2 in the Regulated Qualifications Framework (RQF). Trinity is the only examinations board to also offer pre-RQF assessments (non-accredited) in Speaking and Listening – ESOL Step 1 and Step 2.

ESOL Skills for Life is externally assessed by a Trinity examiner.

== Teaching Qualifications (TESOL/TEFL) ==
The qualifications range from those starting out in a teaching career to senior teaching and management posts.

== Academic Recognition ==
Trinity ESOL qualifications are accredited by the UK Qualifications and Curriculum Authority (QCA), and its respective partners in Wales and Northern Ireland. They are listed in the UK's UCAS (Universities and Colleges Admissions Service) guide to qualifications acceptable as evidence of English language competency.

UCAS considers English language competency equivalent to NQF Levels 1 or 2 as appropriate for entry to UK higher education. The UCAS guides list the following Trinity ESOL qualifications as acceptable evidence of proficiency in English.

Comparison table for Trinity ESOL, Cambridge English Language Assessment and IELTS examinations

QCA NQF	CEFR Level	Trinity GESE	Trinity ISE	Trinity ESOL Skills for Life	Trinity ESOL for Work	Cambridge English Language Assessment	IELTS
Entry 1	A1	Grades 2	-	Entry 1	-	-	-
Entry 2	A2	Grades 3 & 4	ISE Foundation	Entry 2	-	KET	3.0
Entry 3	B1	Grades 5 & 6	ISE I	Entry 3	Entry 3	PET	4.0
Level 1	B2	Grades 7, 8, & 9	ISE II	Level 1	Level 1	FCE	5.5
Level 2	C1	Grades 10 & 11	ISE III	Level 2	-	CAE	6.5
Level 3	C2	Grade 12	ISE IV	-	-	CPE	7.5

Worldwide accreditation varies from country to country.

== Link to Common European Framework of Reference (CEFR) ==
The Trinity suite of exams are linked to the Common European Framework of Reference for Languages(CEFR). This framework sets standards in foreign language learning/teaching across Europe, by categorising learners into six levels of ability. The

Trinity ESOL exams fit into this framework as shown in the table

CEFR	Trinity GESE	Trinity ISE	Trinity ESOL Skills for Life
n/a	Grade 1	-	-
A1	Grade 2	-	Entry 1
A2	Grade 3 & 4	ISE Foundation	Entry 2
B1	Grade 5 & 6	ISE I	Entry 3
B2	Grade 7, 8 & 9	ISE II	Level 1
C1	Grade 10 & 11	ISE III	Level 2
C2	Grade 12	ISE IV	-

== See also ==
- English as an additional language
- Teaching English as a Foreign Language
