= Contrasts =

Contrasts may refer to:

- Contrasts (Aziza Mustafa Zadeh album), 2006
- Contrasts (Bucky Pizzarelli & John Pizzarelli album), 1999
- Contrasts (Sam Rivers album), 1979
- Contrasts (Larry Young album), 1967
- Contrasts (Erroll Garner album), 1955
- Contrasts (Bartók), a chamber music composition

== See also ==
- Contrast (disambiguation)
