= Contrast =

Contrast may refer to:

== Science ==
- Contrast (vision), the contradiction in form, colour and light between parts of an image
- Contrast (statistics), a combination of averages whose coefficients add up to zero, or the difference between two means
- Behavioral contrast, a phenomenon studied in psychology (behavior analysis)
- Contrast agent, used to distinguish structures or fluids within a body, often shortened to just "contrast"

== Technology ==
- Contrast ratio, a measure of a display system
- Display contrast, of electronic visual displays

== Language ==
- Contrast (linguistics), expressing distinctions between words
  - Phonemic contrast
- Contrast (literary), describing the difference(s) between two or more entities

== Arts and entertainment ==
=== Music ===
- The Contrast (band), an English pop band formed in 1999
- Contrast (music), the difference between parts or different instrumental sounds
- High Contrast, Welsh music producer and artist born in 1979

==== Albums ====
- Contrast (Tages album), 1967
- Contrast (Conor Maynard album), 2012
- Contrast (Matt Fax album), 2017
- Contrast (EP), by the Features, 2006
- Contrast, by Emi Maria, 2010
- Contrast, by Klinik, 1992
- Contrast, by Signal Aout 42, 1990
- Contrast, an EP by Toru Kitajima, 2014

=== Other media ===
- Contrast (video game), a 2013 puzzle-based platform game
- Contrast (TV series), a Japanese romantic drama television series
- The Contrast (play), a 1787 play by Royall Tyler
- The Contrast (novel), an 1832 novel by Lord Normanby

== See also ==
- Contrastive (disambiguation)
- Contrasts (disambiguation)
