= Extramural English =

Language learning outside the school

In the field of second-language acquisition, extramural English (EE) is English that learners come in contact with or are involved in outside the walls of the classroom, often through streaming media and online games. It is an example of informal learning of English. EE includes using English-mediated media, listening to music, watching films or series, using social network sites, reading books and playing video games that require the use of English. EE includes both online and offline activities and is always initiated by the learner, not by the teacher. EE activities can be carried out with or without deliberate intention to improve English language proficiency. Hence, EE encompasses both incidental and intentional language learning. EE research that centers on online activities is often viewed as computer-assisted language learning (CALL) research. EE is linked to the theory of learner autonomy.

The term extramural English was first coined in 2009 by Pia Sundqvist. It refers to 'English outside the walls' (from Latin extramural, where the prefix, extra, means 'outside' and the stem, mural, means 'wall').

Research studies report several learning benefits of EE, such as promoting vocabulary acquisition, fostering learner autonomy, increasing literacy development and encouraging self-regulated learning. To bridge learning English outside and inside the classroom some teachers use a 30-day challenge with a focus on EE activities. This way of learning a language is not particular to English but can involve any target language. The overarching term referring to learning any target language is Extramural L_{anguage}.
