= Robert Lado =

American linguist (1915–1995)

Dr. Robert Lado
- Born: May 31, 1915; Tampa, Florida, United States
- Died: December 11, 1995 (aged 80); Washington, District of Columbia, United States
- Education: Rollins College; University of Texas at Austin; University of Michigan
- Known for: Linguist

Dr. Robert Lado (May 31, 1915, Tampa, Florida – December 11, 1995, Washington) was an American linguist.

== Early life ==
His parents were Spanish immigrants who relocated to Spain before he had a chance to learn English. He returned to the United States at the age of 21 and began to learn English as an adult. This allowed him to develop an understanding of and sensitivity to the challenges confronting immigrants and speakers of other languages learning English as a second language.

== Education ==
Lado received his Bachelor of Arts from Rollins College in Winter Park, Florida and his Master of Arts from the University of Texas at Austin. He received his doctorate from the University of Michigan.

== Professor ==
He later became a Professor of English and the Director of the University of Michigan's English Language Institute. After several years at the University of Michigan, he joined the staff of Georgetown University in Washington, D.C. At Georgetown, he served as dean of the Institute of Languages (later renamed the Faculty of Languages and Linguistics) for 13 years.

Dr. Lado obtained a Ford-Fulbright Foundation grant to establish English departments at five universities in Spain and cooperated with universities in Latin America. He traveled extensively throughout the world lecturing on linguistics and has received worldwide recognition and honors including honorary doctorates from Georgetown and Sophia University in Tokyo, Japan.

== Contrastive linguistics ==
Lado is considered one of the founders of modern contrastive linguistics, which, as a subdiscipline of applied linguistics, served the purpose of improving language teaching materials. His most influential book is Linguistics across cultures: Applied linguistics for language teachers, in which he states that "in the comparison between native and foreign language lies the key to ease or difficulty in foreign language learning." The book outlines methods for comparing two systems of sound, grammar, vocabulary, writing, and culture.

Lado and Charles Carpenter Fries were both associated with the strong version of the contrastive hypothesis, the belief that difficulties in learning a language can be predicted on the basis of a systematic comparison of the system of the learner's first language (its grammar, phonology, and lexicon) with the system of a second language.

== Lado International Institute ==
He later founded and served as president of the Lado International Institute, a successful language instruction institution based on an academically rigorous English education program for speakers of other languages. The school had three campuses in the Washington Metropolitan Area (Washington, D.C., Arlington, Virginia and Silver Spring, Maryland). After COVID-19 pandemic, the school closed its campuses in Silver Spring and Washington DC. Currently, Lado International College is located in Vienna, Virginia.

== Language testing ==
In recognition of Lado's ground-breaking contributions to the field of language testing (Lado, 1961), the International Language Testing Association (ILTA) created the prestigious Robert Lado Memorial Award for Outstanding Student Paper presented annually at the Language Testing Research Colloquium (LTRC).

== Other activities ==
During his life, he was member of the Spanish Catholic Center in Washington. He also received the medal of honor from the Daughters of the American Revolution of the District of Columbia. He was one of the co-founders of Teachers of English to Speakers of Other Languages (TESOL), a professional association with a mission of teaching English to foreign students.
