= National Association for Teaching English and Community Languages to Adults =

National Association for Teaching English and other Community Languages to Adults (NATECLA) is a forum and professional association for teachers of ESOL and what are known as "community languages" to adults within the UK and Ireland.

Through its branch network, workshops, conferences, training events and publications NATECLA shares information, expertise, comment and good practice with its members, most of whom are involved in the education and training of adults whose first language is not English. Typically members are teachers, tutors, trainers, lecturers, teacher trainers, trainee teachers or researchers, managers or organisers.

NATECLA supports the Ruth Hayman Trust, which gives grants to individuals whose first language is not English who otherwise would not be able to study or train in Britain. The trust was founded in honour of Ruth Hayman, who worked for racial equality and justice and played a key part in the setting up of NATECLA's forerunner NATESLA (National Association for the Teaching of English as a Second Language to Adults) in 1978.
