= WebQuest =

Lesson format based on the internet

A WebQuest is an inquiry-oriented lesson format in which most or all the information that learners work with comes from the web. These can be created using various programs, including a simple word processing document that includes links to websites.

== Distinguishing characteristics ==
A WebQuest is distinguished from other Internet-based research by four characteristics. First, it is classroom-based. Second, it emphasizes higher-order thinking (such as analysis, creativity, or criticism) rather than just acquiring information. And third, the teacher preselects the sources, emphasizing information use rather than information gathering. Finally, though solo WebQuests are not unknown, most WebQuests are group work with the task frequently being split into roles.

== Structure ==
A WebQuest has 6 essential parts: introduction, task, process, resources, evaluation, and conclusion. The original paper on WebQuests had a component called guidance instead of evaluation.

=== Task ===
The task is the formal description of what the students will produce in the WebQuest.

=== Process ===
The steps the students should take to accomplish the task. It is frequently profitable to reinforce the written process with some demonstrations.

=== Resources ===
The resources the students should use. Providing these helps focus the exercise on processing information rather than just locating it. Though the instructor may search for the online resources as a separate step, it is good to incorporate them as links within the process section where they will be needed rather than just including them as a long list elsewhere. Having off-line resources like visiting lecturers and sculptures can contribute greatly to the interest of the students.

=== Evaluation ===
The way in which the students' performance will be evaluated. The standards should be fair, clear, consistent, and specific to the tasks set.

=== Conclusion ===
Time set aside for reflection and discussion of possible extensions.

== Use in education ==
Webquests can be a valuable addition to a collaborative classroom. One of the goals is to increase critical thinking by employing higher levels of Bloom’s taxonomy and Webb’s Depth of Knowledge. This is a goal of the American educational system's Common Core and many new American state standards for public education. Since most webquests are done in small collaborative groups, they can foster cooperative learning and collaborative activities. Students will often be assigned roles, allowing them to roleplay in different positions, and learn how to deal with conflict within the group.

Webquests can be a versatile tool for teaching students. They can be used to introduce new knowledge, to deepen knowledge, or to allow students to test hypotheses as part of a final interaction with knowledge. The integration of computers and the Internet also increase students’ competency with technology. By having specific task lists, students can stay on task. By having specific sources of information, students can focus on using resources to answer questions rather than vetting resources to use which is a different skill altogether.

In inclusive classrooms (classrooms that have students of varying exceptionalities interacting such as learning disabled, language impaired, or giftedness) tasks can be differentiated to a skill level or collaborative groups for the same level of task. A skill level may have students with learning disabilities working on a basic task to meet the minimum standard of learning skills and gifted students pushing their task to the higher end of the learning skill. More commonly, groups are composed of learners of all skill levels and completing the same level of task. This is typically easier because the teacher is only creating one webquest, but can cause less student interaction from lower students and less learning from higher students.

=== Limitations of WebQuests ===
WebQuests are only one tool in a teacher's toolboxes. They are not appropriate to every learning goal. In particular, they are weak in teaching factual total recall, simple procedures, and definitions.

WebQuests also usually require good reading skills, so are not appropriate to the youngest classrooms or to students with language and reading difficulties without accommodations. One might ask an adult to assist with the reading or use screen-reading technologies, such as VoiceOver or Jaws.

== How WebQuests are developed ==
Learners typically complete WebQuests as cooperative groups. Each learner within a group can be given a "role," or specific area to research. WebQuests may take the form of role-playing scenarios, where students take on the personas of professional researchers or historical figures.

A teacher can search for WebQuests on a particular topic or they can develop their own using a web editor like Microsoft FrontPage or Adobe Dreamweaver. This tool allows learners to complete various tasks using other cognitive toolsboxes (e.g. Microsoft Word, PowerPoint, Access, Excel, and Publisher). With the focus of education increasingly being turned to differentiated instruction, teachers are using WebQuests more frequently. WebQuests also help to address the different learning styles of each students. The number of activities associated with a WebQuest can reach almost any student.

WebQuests may be created by anyone; typically they are developed by educators. The first part of a WebQuest is the introduction. This describes the WebQuest and gives the purpose of the activity. The next part describes what students will do. Then is a list of what to do and how to do it. There is usually a list of links to follow to complete the activity.

Finally, WebQuests do not have to be developed as a true web site. They may be developed and implemented using lower threshold (less demanding) technologies, (e.g. they may be saved as a word document on a local computer).

Many Webquests are being developed by college students across the United States as a requirement for their k-12 planning e-portfolio.

== Developments in WebQuest methodologies ==
The WebQuest methodology has been transferred to language learning in the 3D virtual world Second Life to create a more immersive and interactive experience.

=== Tools ===
WebQuests are simple webpages, and they can be built with any software that allows you to create websites. Tech-savvy users can develop HTML in Notepad or Notepad++, while others will want to use the templates available in word processing suites like Microsoft Word and OpenOffice. More advanced web development software, like Dreamweaver and FrontPage, will give you the most control over the design of your webquest. Webquest templates allow educators to get a jump start on the development of WebQuest by providing a pre-designed format which generally can be easily edited. These templates are categorized as "Framed" or "Unframed," and they can have a navigation bar at the top, bottom, left, or right of the content.

There are several websites that are specifically geared towards creating webquests. Questgarden, Zunal, and Teacherweb all allow teachers to create accounts, and these websites walk them through the process of creating a webquest. OpenWebQuest is a similar service, although it is based in Greece and much of the website is in Greek. These websites offer little control over design, but they make the creation process very simple and straightforward.

Alternatively, teachers can use one of a number of free website services to create their own website and structure it as a webquest. Wordpress and Edublogs both allow users to create free blogs, and navigation menus can be created to string a series of pages into a webquest. This option offers a greater deal of flexibility than pre-made webquests, but it requires a little more technical know-how.
