= Genre analysis =

Genre analysis may refer to:

- Genre criticism
- Genre studies
