= Contrastive analysis =

Linguistic study

Contrastive analysis is the systematic study of a couple of languages with a view to identifying their structural differences and similarities. Historically it has been used to establish language genealogies.

== Second language acquisition ==
Contrastive analysis was used extensively in the field of second language acquisition (SLA) in the 1960s and early 1970s, as a method of explaining why some features of a target language were more difficult to acquire than others. According to the behaviourist theories prevailing at the time, language learning was a question of habit formation, and this could be reinforced or impeded by existing habits. Therefore, the difficulty in mastering certain structures in a second language (L2) depended on the difference between the learners' mother language (L1) and the language they were trying to learn.

=== History ===
The theoretical foundations for what became known as the contrastive analysis hypothesis were formulated in Robert Lado's Linguistics Across Cultures (1957). In this book, Lado claimed that "those elements which are similar to [the learner's] native language will be simple for him, and those elements that are different will be difficult". While it was not a novel suggestion, Lado was the first to provide a comprehensive theoretical treatment and to suggest a systematic set of technical procedures for the contrastive study of languages. That involved describing the languages (using structuralist linguistics), comparing them and predicting learning difficulties.

During the 1960s, there was a widespread enthusiasm with this technique, manifested in the contrastive descriptions of several European languages, many of which were sponsored by the Center for Applied Linguistics in Washington, DC. It was expected that once the areas of potential difficulty had been mapped out through contrastive analysis, it would be possible to design language courses more efficiently. Contrastive analysis, along with behaviourism and structuralism exerted a profound effect on SLA curriculum design and language teacher education, and provided the theoretical pillars of the audio-lingual method.

=== Criticism and its response ===
In its strongest formulation, the contrastive analysis hypothesis claimed that all the errors made in learning the L2 could be attributed to 'interference' by the L1. However, this claim could not be sustained by empirical evidence that was accumulated in the mid- and late 1970s. It was soon pointed out that many errors predicted by Contrastive Analysis were inexplicably not observed in learners' language. Even more confusingly, some uniform errors were made by learners irrespective of their L1. It thus became clear that contrastive analysis could not predict all learning difficulties, but was certainly useful in the retrospective explanation of errors.

In response to the above criticisms, a moderate version of the Contrastive Analysis Hypothesis (CAH) has developed which paradoxically contradicts Lado's original claim. The new CAH hypothesizes that the more different the L2 is with one's L1, the easier it is for one to learn the target language. The prediction is based on the premise that similarities in languages create confusion for learners.

With the help of technological advancement, contrastive analysis has adopted a more efficient method in obtaining language data, a corpus-based approach, which generates vast amount of juxtapositions of language differences in various fields of linguistics, for example lexis and syntax.

== Applications ==
There are multiple fields in the realms of linguistics to which Contrastive Analysis (CA) is applicable:

- Historical linguistics, a former application of CA, which is subsumed under the name comparative linguistics, a branch in linguistics not to be confused with CA.
- Second language teaching: Despite CA's limitation in the prediction of L2 learners' errors, it provides insights to at least some of the major mistakes that are frequently made by L2 learners irrespective of their L1. Hence, more tailor-made language design can be adopted; examples include awareness raising teaching method and hierarchical learning teaching curriculum.
- Second language learning: Awareness raising is the major contribution of CA in second language learning. This includes CA's abilities to explain observed errors and to outline the differences between two languages; upon language learners' realization of these aspects, they can work to adopt a viable way to learn instead of rote learning, and correct fossilized language errors.
- Sociolinguistics, psycholinguistics, bilingualism, pragmatics and others cultural-related areas: CA is, in itself, a cross-linguistic/cross-cultural study, and its ability to apply both linguistic and non-linguistic features is one of its major merits. This permits a better linguistic-cultural understanding, which is essential for learning a language in its entirety.
- Translation: CA provides better understanding of linguistic difference between two languages and therefore may be applied to the field of translation. Primarily, CA certainly lays a foundation for translation as it is integral that translators and interpreters have a thorough understanding of not only the languages they work between, but of the differences between them as well. Also, it might balance the word-for-word vs. sense-for sense debate by developing strategies to overcome the linguistic hindrance. Moreover, it may avoid awkward translations such as translationese and Europeanization.
- Language therapy: Distinguishing the difference between language disorder patients from non-standard dialect speakers. This is essential in identifying speech pathology and their corresponding treatment.
- Criminal investigation: CA research offers insight to subtle differences among languages. Language patterns can be used as clues to investigate criminal activities, for example analyzing phishing texts designed to deceive users into giving away confidential information.

== See also ==
- Comparative linguistics
- Contrastive linguistics
- Pseudoscientific language comparison
