= Society of Pakistan English Language Teachers =

Society of Pakistan English Language Teachers (SPELT) is a professional forum for practitioners teaching English as a foreign/second language to facilitate effective communication and improve the teaching/learning standards of English in Pakistan.

== Introduction ==
The Society of Pakistan English Language Teachers SPELT was formed in 1984 in Karachi, Pakistan. It is dedicated to improving the standard of English language learning and teaching in Pakistan. SPELT enables maximum exploitation of the limited resources available in the country. It attempts to be well-informed about recent developments in teaching techniques, which invariably need to be modified in order to suit the needs and limitations of the Pakistan situation. It is affiliated with a number of international professional associations like Teachers of English to Speakers of Other Languages (TESOL) and International Association of Teachers of English as a Foreign Language (IATEFL), and is supported by the British Council.

== Mission ==
SPELT's mission is to provide a professional forum for practitioners teaching English as a foreign/second language to facilitate effective communication and improve the teaching/learning standards of English in Pakistan.

== Activities ==
- Teacher development courses.
- Two hour academic session every month.
- International conference every year.
- Networking of teachers worldwide through courses and conferences.
- Publication of the journal SPELT Quarterly.

== International conference ==
This conference will provide a forum for teachers to understand and link teaching theories and practices in the classroom. It will is an excellent opportunity to see theory and practice as two sides of the same coin and to network. Papers, presentations and workshops will cover themes of classroom practices, learner-centered approach, research in language teaching/learning and the relationship between language teaching and language learning.

== See also ==
- English language learning and teaching
- Teaching English as a foreign language
