= Michigan Language Assessment =

- Established: 1941
- Type: Not-for-profit
- Purpose: Examination board - qualifications for learners and teachers of English
- Headquarters: Michigan, USA
- Region served: Global - operating in 60 countries
- Members: 497 test centers
- Parent organization: Cambridge Assessment English and the University of Michigan
- Website: michiganassessment.org www.facebook.com/camlaglobal
- Formerly called: English Language Institute Testing and Certification Division at the University of Michigan

Michigan Language Assessment (MLA), also known as the Cambridge–Michigan Language Assessment (CaMLA) and previously the "English Language Institute Testing and Certification Division at the University of Michigan", has been providing English language assessments, learning resources, teacher development, consultancy and research since 1941.

Their range of assessments, which include what are often referred to as the Michigan Tests, are used for university admissions, IEP programs, K-12 ELL programs, professional licensing, and employment.

Michigan Language Assessment is a not-for-profit collaboration between the University of Michigan and the University of Cambridge – two institutions with a long history of research and development in the field of language assessment, teaching and learning.

== History ==
CaMLA was established in 2010 by two organizations with a long history in English language assessment: Cambridge Assessment English, part of the University of Cambridge, and the English Language Institute Testing and Certificate Division of the University of Michigan. The organizations have a number of similarities – both being university-based and not-for-profit examining boards.

CaMLA was created as a joint venture to develop the Michigan tests and services, originally established by the English Language Institute (ELI) of the University of Michigan. It is therefore building on 70 years of research and development in language teaching, learning, assessment, applied linguistics and teacher education throughout the world.

The ELI was established at the University of Michigan in 1941 and was the first of its kind in the United States, with a dual function of teaching and research. In its first year, the ELI introduced an intensive course in English as a foreign language – the first ever offered on a university campus. This was started as an experimental program, catering for the handful of foreign students in U.S. universities prior to World War II. However, by 1948, there were 25,000 foreign students in U.S. universities and the ELI became a key player in teaching English to international students and a model for programs across the country.

From 1946, the ELI English Testing Program began to take shape. In 1953, under contract to the United States Information Agency, the ELI developed the ECPE (Examination for the Certificate of Proficiency in English) exam for use abroad. By the late 1950s, ELI had international language development programs in countries on five continents and by the 1960s -1970s, Michigan tests were being used by increasing numbers of schools, universities and institutes, nationally and internationally.

The ELI also became well known for its research and development work. The Research Club at Michigan established the first journal in the world in applied linguistics: Language Learning: A Journal of Applied Linguistics. The institute also focused on the practical day-to-day realities of language teaching – experimenting with instructional methods and materials, and developing methodologies for training ESL/EFL teachers. Its teaching methods and materials have been used in programs all over the world and the Michigan Method continues to influence ESL/EFL publishing to this day.

== Exams ==
=== Proficiency and certification tests ===
| Exam | Description |
| ECCE | The Examination for the Certificate of Competency in English (ECCE) is a standardized high-intermediate level EFL examination |
| ECPE | The Examination for the Certificate of Proficiency in English (ECPE) is a standardized, advanced-level EFL examination |
| MET Go! | MET Go! is a new, multilevel test designed in full color specifically for learners aged 11–15. The MET Go! test includes reading, listening, and writing sections, with an optional speaking section. |
| MET | The Michigan English Test (MET) assesses general English language proficiency in social, educational, and workplace contexts and reflects everyday, authentic interaction in an American-English environment |
| MYLE | The Michigan Young Learners English (MYLE) are designed to test the English of young learners in the primary and middle grades |

=== Placement and progress test ===
| Exam | Description |
| Michigan EPT | The Michigan English Placement Test assesses receptive language proficiency and supports teachers and program administrators to place ESL students into appropriate levels and classes |

== See also ==
- CaMLA English Placement Test
- Examination for the Certificate of Competency in English (ECCE)
- Examination for the Certificate of Proficiency in English (ECPE)
- Michigan English Test (MET)
- Young Learners Tests of English (YLTE)
- University of Michigan
- Cambridge Assessment English
- English as a Foreign or Second Language
- List of language proficiency tests
