= Supreme Council for Civil Personnel Selection =

Commission of the Greek government

- Ανώτατο Συμβούλιο Επιλογής Προσωπικού (ΑΣΕΠ)
- Abbreviation: ASEP
- Formation: March 3, 1994
- Legal status: Public
- Headquarters: 6 Poulou street, 115 23 Athens, Greece
- Location: Greece
- Coordinates: 37°59′15″N 23°45′35″E
- Official language: Greek
- Website: info.asep.gr

The Supreme Council for Civil Personnel Selection (Greek: Ανώτατο Συμβούλιο Επιλογής Προσωπικού, Α.Σ.Ε.Π., Anótato Symvoúlio Epilogís Prosopikoú, ASEP), is an independent commission in Greece that recruits and selects people for personnel and employment in the public sector of Greece.

The Council is supervised by the Ministry of Administrative Reform and e-Governance, but is not under government control.

== Organisational structure ==
ASEP is composed by the following structure:

- Chairman
- Two vice presidents
- 21 advisers

Individuals selected to become ASEP's organisational structure are usually those who work in the following positions:

- Members of the high judiciary.
- Employees or heads of the government's main departments.
- Employees, professors, or assistant professors of higher education institutions.
- Heads of public entities and other legal persons of the public sector.

== Roles ==
ASEP exclusively performs the following tasks:

- Selection of permanent and part-time personnel for the public sector.
- Control of institutions in the public sector that choose permanent and seasonal/contract agents personnel.
- Conduct of written competition for the teachers.
