= Contrastive linguistics =

Practice-oriented linguistic approach

Contrastive linguistics is a practice-oriented linguistic approach that seeks to describe the differences and similarities between a pair of languages (hence it is occasionally called "differential linguistics").

== History ==
While traditional linguistic studies had developed comparative methods (comparative linguistics), chiefly to demonstrate family relations between cognate languages, or to illustrate the historical developments of one or more languages, modern contrastive linguistics intends to show in what ways the two respective languages differ, in order to help in the solution of practical problems. (Sometimes the terms diachronic linguistics and synchronic linguistics are used to refer to these two perspectives.)

Contrastive linguistics, since its inception by Robert Lado in the 1950s, has often been linked to aspects of applied linguistics, e.g., to avoid interference errors in foreign-language learning, as advocated by Di Pietro (1971) (see also contrastive analysis), to assist interlingual transfer in the process of translating texts from one language into another, as demonstrated by Vinay & Darbelnet (1958) and more recently by Hatim (1997) (see translation), and to find lexical equivalents in the process of compiling bilingual dictionaries, as illustrated by Heltai (1988) and Hartmann (1991) (see bilingual lexicography).

Contrastive descriptions can occur at every level of linguistic structure: speech sounds (phonology), written symbols (orthography), word-formation (morphology), word meaning (lexicology), collocation (phraseology), sentence structure (syntax) and complete discourse (textology). Various techniques used in corpus linguistics have been shown to be relevant in intralingual and interlingual contrastive studies, e.g. by 'parallel-text' analysis (Hartmann 1997).

Contrastive linguistic studies can also be applied to the differential description of one or more varieties within a language, such as styles (contrastive rhetoric), dialects, registers or terminologies of technical genres.

== See also ==
- Contrastive analysis
- Translation
- Contrastive rhetoric
