= CaMLA English Placement Test =

Test of students' proficiency in English

Logo

The CaMLA English Placement Test (EPT) is used principally by English language teaching schools to assess students' language ability levels and place them in the right English language course.

The CaMLA EPT is developed by CaMLA, a not-for-profit collaboration between the University of Michigan and the University of Cambridge, and has been in use for over four decades.

== See also ==
- Cambridge Assessment English
- English as a Foreign or Second Language
