= Functional English =

Functional English is usage of the English language required to perform a specific function. This is typically taught as a foundation subject when a good command of English is required for academic study and career progression. In some cases, a particular form of technical English, such as Aviation English, may be required for a particular vocation. Such specialised usage is known and taught as English for specific purposes (ESP).

Functional English differs from traditional English studies by emphasizing practical communication skills over literary analysis.

== See also ==
- English as a foreign or second language
