= Ali H. S. Hajjaj =

Gaza-born Canadian linguist (1933–2004)

Ali Hussein Salman Hajjaj (1933–2004) was the first non-English speaking person to acquire a Ph.D. in Applied Linguistics of the English Language. He attained his Ph.D. from Department of Linguistics and English Language of the University of Lancaster, UK in 1979.

Hajjaj was born in Gaza Palestine, in 1933. He acquired Canadian citizenship in 1995. He died in the city of Amman, Jordan, while he was the Head of English Department at the Faculty of Arts at Petra University, Jordan.

Hajjaj contributed to English Language Teaching (ELT) to native English language speakers as well as English as a Second Language (ESL) and English as a Foreign Language (EFL).

== Education ==
He graduated with a B.A. in English Literature from Cairo University, Egypt in 1955.

He obtained a M.A. (Master's degree) in Applied Linguistics from University of Lancaster, England in 1973. The Title of his M.A. Thesis was "A Suggested Approach to a Functional Syllabus for ELT".

He received his Ph.D. in applied linguistics, from the University of Lancaster in 1979. The special field was Functional Nature of Language. The Title of his Ph.D. Thesis was "The Nature and Understanding of the Term Function and its Application to ESP".

== Career ==
Hajjaj's book Errors in English among Arabic speakers, co-authored with Nayef Kharma, was one of the core works cited in a later paper "The English pronunciation of Arabic speakers: A data-driven approach to segmental error identification" by Rehmann et al.

== Selected publications ==
- Hajjaj, Ali (1999). Arab students` writing mistakes: Renewing the issue. Dirasat: Human and Social Sciences, University of Jordan, 26.2: 621-633.
- Ali Hajjaj & Nayef Kharma (1989) Errors in English among Arabic Speakers: Analysis and Remedy. Longman, London. Co-Author

- Errors in English among Arabic speakers: analysis and remedy / Nayef Kharma, Ali Hajjaj. Beirut: York Press: Librairie du Liban, 1997 (ISBN 9780866856836)
