= Eurospeak Language School =

Location
- Reading, Berkshire and Southampton, Hampshire; United Kingdom; 51.4551°N 0.9732°W

Information
- Established: 1991
- Enrolment: 1349
- Website: www.eurospeak.ac.uk

Eurospeak Language School is an institution that specializes in English language training and cultural exchange. The school was founded in 1991 and is in Reading, United Kingdom. The founder of Eurospeak, Michael O'Brien, died in 2011. Eurospeak also has a "subsidiary" in Almaty, Kazakhstan. Each year, Eurospeak welcomes more than 1,349 students from over 71 nationalities. In May 2018, Eurospeak submitted a planning application to create new premises at Cumberland Place, Southampton. The planning application was approved, and Eurospeak Southampton opened in October 2018.

== Accreditations ==
Eurospeak has been accredited by the UK Border Agency as a Tier 4 Sponsor. Eurospeak has been inspected accredited by the Independent Schools Inspectorate. The inspection in September 2016 states: "The language school exceeds expectations for the quality of education" Eurospeak has also been inspected and accredited by the British Council. It is a registered centre for University of Cambridge ESOL Examinations (PET, FCE, CAE and CPE), Trinity College London examinations, EMD ESOL International examinations and a Trinity College London validated provide of the Trinity CertTESOL teacher training course. The school is also on the Skills Funding Agency's Register of Training Organizations. The Register includes organisations that are eligible to be invited to tender for providing education and skills training services and are hence, entitled to compete for funding. Eurospeak has also been featured in Kazakh news for its role in the field of English education.

Mr Rob Wilson, Member of Parliament for Reading East, distributed certificates to group of Italian students, from two schools in the Italian Province of Vicenza which were hosted by Reading's Eurospeak Language School. He congratulated the students on the progress they have made and highlighted some of the benefits of learning a foreign language. He also provided them with an overview of his role as Member of Parliament for Reading East, as well as touching on subjects such as comparisons and contrasts between Italy and the UK - and of course, Italian politics.

On 30 October 2018, Eurospeak Reading was inspected by the Independent Schools Inspectorate for a monitoring visit and was found to exceed expectations. At the previous inspection of 20 – 22 September 2016 the language school was found to exceed expectations and the quality of education as judged at that time has been maintained.

The Independent Schools Inspectorate found that the quality of the curriculum, teaching and learners’ achievements is excellent. The provision meets student needs and is effective in supporting progress. Courses on offer to Tier 4 students lead to qualifications or outcomes which meet the definition of an approved qualification for Home Office purposes. Teaching is excellent and lessons are well planned. Students’ welfare, including health and safety, is excellent. Pastoral support is excellent. Teaching is excellent. The highly motivated teachers employ a range of activities to interest and challenge students. They display excellent subject knowledge and motivate students to learn and progress.

== Programmes ==
Eurospeak offers courses in English as a foreign language, English exam preparation, Teaching English as a foreign language and summer schools to both children and adults. In Kazakhstan, Eurospeak partners with schools and universities in Almaty, Astana and Kyzylorda.

== Courses ==
- General English Courses
- Bespoke Business English Courses
- Bespoke English for Special Purposes Courses
- IELTS Preparation Courses
- Cambridge Examination Preparation Courses

== See also ==
- Cambridge English Language Assessment
- International English Language Testing System
- Language Education
- Berlitz Corporation
