= Aviation English =

Subset of English used in civilian aircraft operation

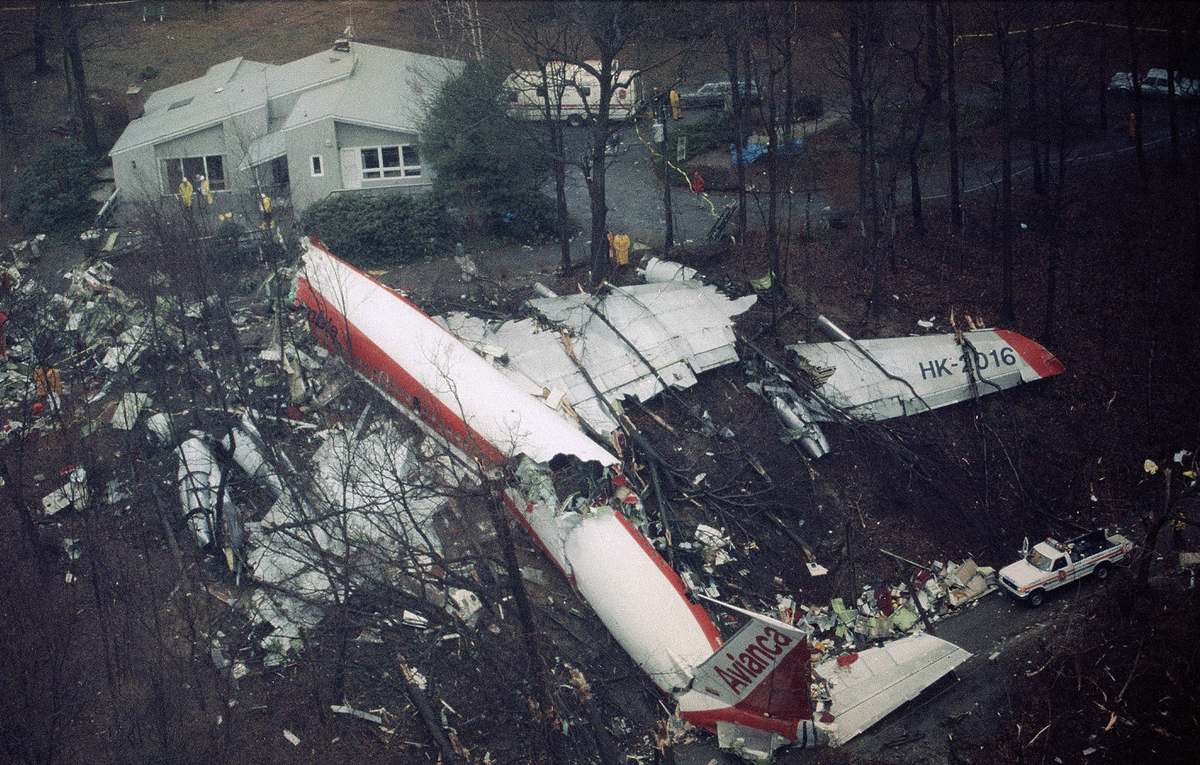
Avianca Flight 052 is an example of a fatal crash resulting from inadequate communication

Aviation English is the de facto international language of civil aviation. With the expansion of air travel in the 20th century, there were safety concerns about the ability of pilots and air traffic controllers to communicate. In 1951, the International Civil Aviation Organization (ICAO) recommended in "ICAO Annex 10 ICAO (Vol I, 5.2.1.1.2) to the International Chicago Convention" that English be universally used for "international aeronautical radiotelephony communications." Despite being a recommendation only, ICAO aviation English was widely accepted.

Aviation English is a type of English for specific purposes, with several specific idiosyncratic structures: for example, any correction of a misspoken word must always be conveyed using the word "correction".

== Background ==
Miscommunication has been an important factor in many aviation accidents. Examples include: the 1977 Tenerife airport accident (583 people dead); the 1990 crash of Avianca Flight 52, in which crew failed to impart their critical fuel emergency to air traffic controllers (73 people dead); and the 1996 Charkhi Dadri mid-air collision (349 people dead). ICAO has acknowledged that "communications, or the lack thereof, has been shown by many accident investigations to play a significant role". In 2003, the ICAO "released amendments to annexes of its Chicago Convention requiring aviation professionals involved in international operations to demonstrate a defined level of English language proficiency in the context of aeronautical communications".

== Proficiency and assessment ==
ICAO requires that this level of proficiency is to be demonstrated by means of a formal language proficiency assessment, and that the results of this assessment are to be recorded as an endorsement on the professional licenses of pilots and controllers." ICAO has defined the language skills to be assessed in its Holistic Descriptors of Operational Language Proficiency (Appendix to Annex 1 of the Convention on International Civil Aviation), and has provided the means to describe the extent of proficiency in these skills in its Language Proficiency Rating Scale (Attachment to Annex 1 of the Convention on International Civil Aviation). The minimum level of proficiency in English required by pilots and air traffic controllers involved in international operations is that described at Operational Level 4 in this Scale.

Although the language proficiency of aviation professionals who are native speakers of English may typically be considered to be equivalent to Expert Level 6 on the ICAO Scale, they may also be sub-standard communicators in Aviation English, specifically by being prone to the use of non-standard terms, demonstrating impatience with non-native speakers, and speaking excessively, as well as too quickly. Such native speaker failings tend to worsen in emergency situations.

=== Tests ===
The need for standardized language proficiency assessments to allow pilots and controllers to demonstrate compliance with the revised 2008 ICAO language proficiency standards has led to the creation of a large number of Aviation English tests. Examples of such tests are the English Language Proficiency for Aeronautical Communication (ELPAC) by Eurocontrol, the Test of English for Aviation (TEA) by Mayflower College, UK, the Test of English for Aviation Personnel (TEAP) by Anglo-Continental School, UK, and the English for Aviation Language Testing System (EALTS) by LTAS Ltd, UK. While the ELPAC test for air traffic controllers (developed by Eurocontrol, in partnership with Zurich University of Applied Sciences/ZHAW) and ENOVATE) is currently the only test formally recognized by ICAO as being fully compliant with ICAO Doc 9835, the TEA, the TEAP, and the EALTS all have recognition from numerous National Aviation Authorities and licensing authorities, including the UK CAA, as being both ICAO Doc 9835 and EASA compliant.

Tests measure the applicants' language competencies across six holistic descriptors (Pronunciation, Structure, Vocabulary, Fluency, Comprehension, Interaction). Each holistic descriptor is measured on a scale of six levels, and the final attributed final level will be the lowest among the six descriptors.

=== Language assessment bodies ===
The testing of the Aviation English for pilots and air traffic controllers is provided by test service providers termed 'Language Assessment Bodies' (LABs). The term "Testing Service Provider" (TSP) is also used with the same meaning. Around the world, language assessment bodies are approved by National Aviation Authorities (NAA) for the purpose of the testing of English for Aviation language proficiency. However, European Aviation Safety Agency (EASA) member states are accepting tests performed by LABs under different EASA NAAs.

== See also ==
- Aviation communication
- Radiotelephony procedure
- Test of English for Aviation
- Controlled language
