= TOEFA =

Examination in English for aviation

TOEFA is the acronym for the Test of English for Aviation, that was the first worldwide examination presented by its author William Aranda, PhD, from Peru, at the International Aviation Language Symposium (IALS) organized by the International Civil Aviation Organization (ICAO) in Montreal, Canada, in September 2004. It was validated with air traffic controllers from Nicaragua, Panama, Bolivia and Peru and with pilots of Peru and Greece.

== Overview ==
TOEFA is a face-to-face examination and it judges the language proficiency (in an aviation context) of pilots and air traffic controllers (ATCOs) according to the holistic and linguistic descriptors established in ICAO Document 9835 (Manual on the Implementation of ICAO language proficiency requirements) issued by this organization in 2004 (first edition) and 2010 (second edition).

TOEFA is designed to measure the English language proficiency level, in the abilities of speaking and understanding of the aeronautical personnel, with the purpose of contributing to the safety and regularity of the air traffic services. The minimum satisfactory level is the Operational Level 4 of the ICAO Rating Scale.

TOEFA has three main test tasks. The first one is called Open Questions and evaluate the language production of the candidate in the linguistic descriptors of pronunciation, structure, vocabulary and fluency. The second task is performed through aviation photos, for the candidate to react to an unexpected situation and describe what he or she sees in the picture. The third task judges the level of comprehension of the candidate, who has to listen to two or three previously recorded audio samples and be able to tell the raters about what he/she understood about it.

The total duration of this English for Aviation test is approximately 30 minutes and it is performed by two trained raters. The raters have previously studied the Initial ICAO Language Proficiency Rater Course and they have experience in language teaching (linguistic rater) and in radio-telephony (operational rater).

The scope and depth of the TOEFA exam is in compliance with the ICAO Language Proficiency Requirements. For this reason, the scope of the evaluation is given by the abilities to speak and to understand, that are specified in the ICAO Annex 1: Licenses to Personnel.

The TOEFA evaluation applies the ICAO Holistic Descriptors and Standards for the Operational Level 4 of the ICAO Rating Scale.
