= FAA Order 7110.65 =

Standards for radio communications in US aviation

FAA Order JO 7110.65 (a.k.a. seventy-one ten dot sixty-five, or .65) is an FAA directive that prescribes air traffic control (ATC) procedures and phraseology for use by personnel providing ATC services in the USA. The current version and subsequent lettered versions (as well as changes to the current version) are published according to the publication schedule contained within the order (paragraph 1-1-6), usually every 6 months. The latest version is 7110.65BB. This revision was issued February 20th, 2025 and made small changes to data block entry and grammatical changes.

This order prescribes air traffic control procedures and phraseology for use by persons providing air traffic control services. Controllers are required to be familiar with the provisions of this order that pertain to their operational responsibilities and to exercise their best judgment if they encounter situations not covered by it. It is the FAA's authoritative source concerning ATC matters.

The order is produced in Adobe Portable Document (PDF) and HTML format by FAA's Mission Support Services, Publications & Administration Group, AJV-P12. It is distributed to select offices in Washington headquarters, regional offices, service area offices, the William J. Hughes Technical Center, and the Mike Monroney Aeronautical Center. Copies are also sent to all air traffic field facilities, international aviation field offices, and to the interested aviation public.

== See also ==
- Aeronautical phraseology
