= English for Specific Purposes World =

Online journal

English for Specific Purposes World (ESP World, ISSN 1682-3257) is an international online journal containing papers concerning English for Specific Purposes (ESP). There are around four issues published a year. There are 62 issues of the journal online. The Journal is listed in , LINGUIST List, NewJour, Google Scholar.

== History ==
The idea of this web-based journal was first voiced around 2000 by Simon Winetroube, then English Language Teaching Projects' Officer at the British Council, Russia. It was later discussed at the 8th ESP Anti-Conference in St. Petersburg, Russia, in October 2001.

This publication became possible due to the support that came from the English Language Teaching Contacts Scheme and the British Council, Russia. The first issue appeared in May 2002.
