= Test of English for Aviation =

Language proficiency test

The Test of English for Aviation (T.E.A.) is a language proficiency test designed and developed by Mayflower College in the United Kingdom.

Following several accidents and incidents where language was a contributing factor (see e.g. Tenerife airport disaster § Communication misunderstandings), the International Civil Aviation Organization now requires all civil pilots and Air traffic controllers (working in an international environment) to have a minimum level of English. The T.E.A. assesses candidates' written and spoken English abilities through the skills of vocabulary, structure, pronunciation, fluency, comprehension, and interactions. It is a test of ability in plain English in aviation settings, not of aeronautical phraseology.

The test is administered by a single examiner in an interview setting with the candidate, and takes 25–30 minutes. The test has three parts. In the first part, the interviewer in the candidate have a general conversation regarding the candidate's interest and experience in aviation. In the second part, the candidate listens to recordings of international English speakers in aviation-related scenarios and responds appropriately. In the third part, the candidate is presented with pictures and is asked to discuss them in English.

== See also ==
- Aviation English
- English Proficiency Test for Aviation
