= International Tenerife Memorial March 27, 1977 =

Memorial for the Tenerife disaster

Coordinates: 28°30′25″N 16°19′06″W

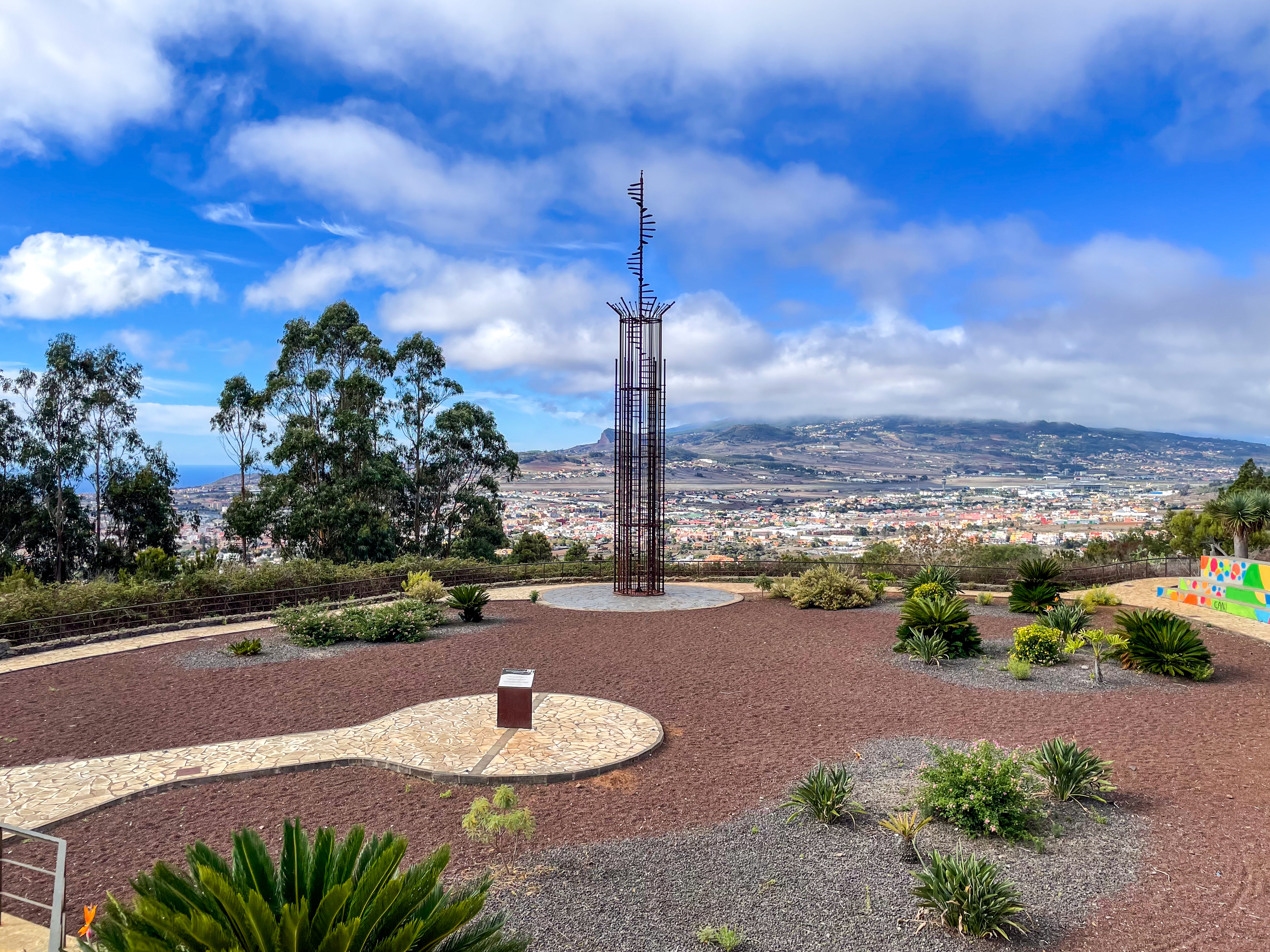
Memorial in 2023 with the airport in the background

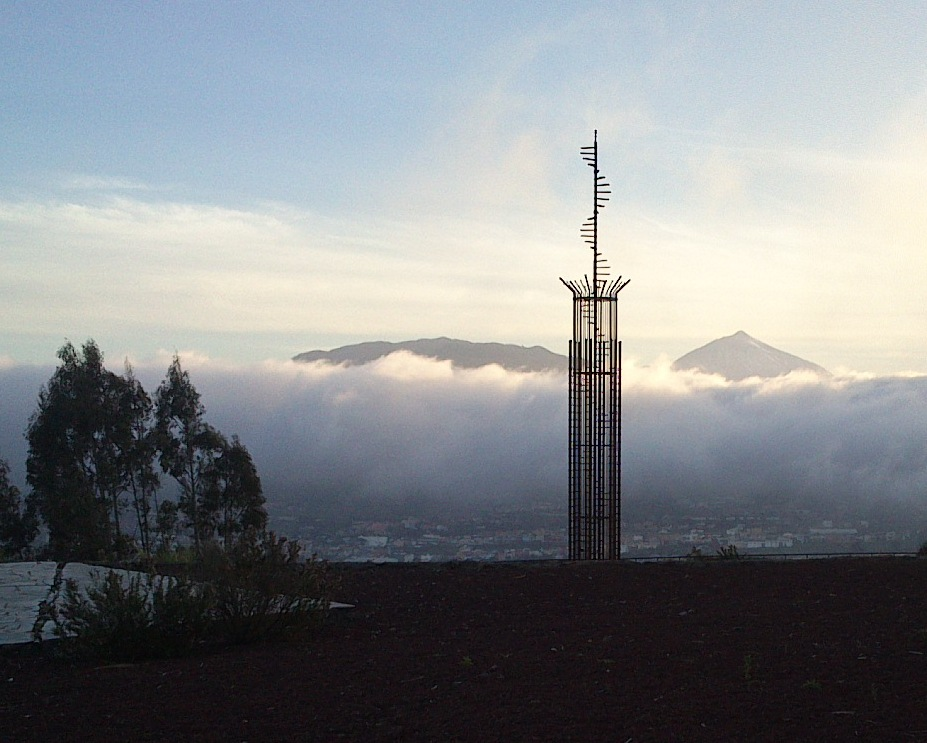
International Tenerife Memorial with Teide peak in the background

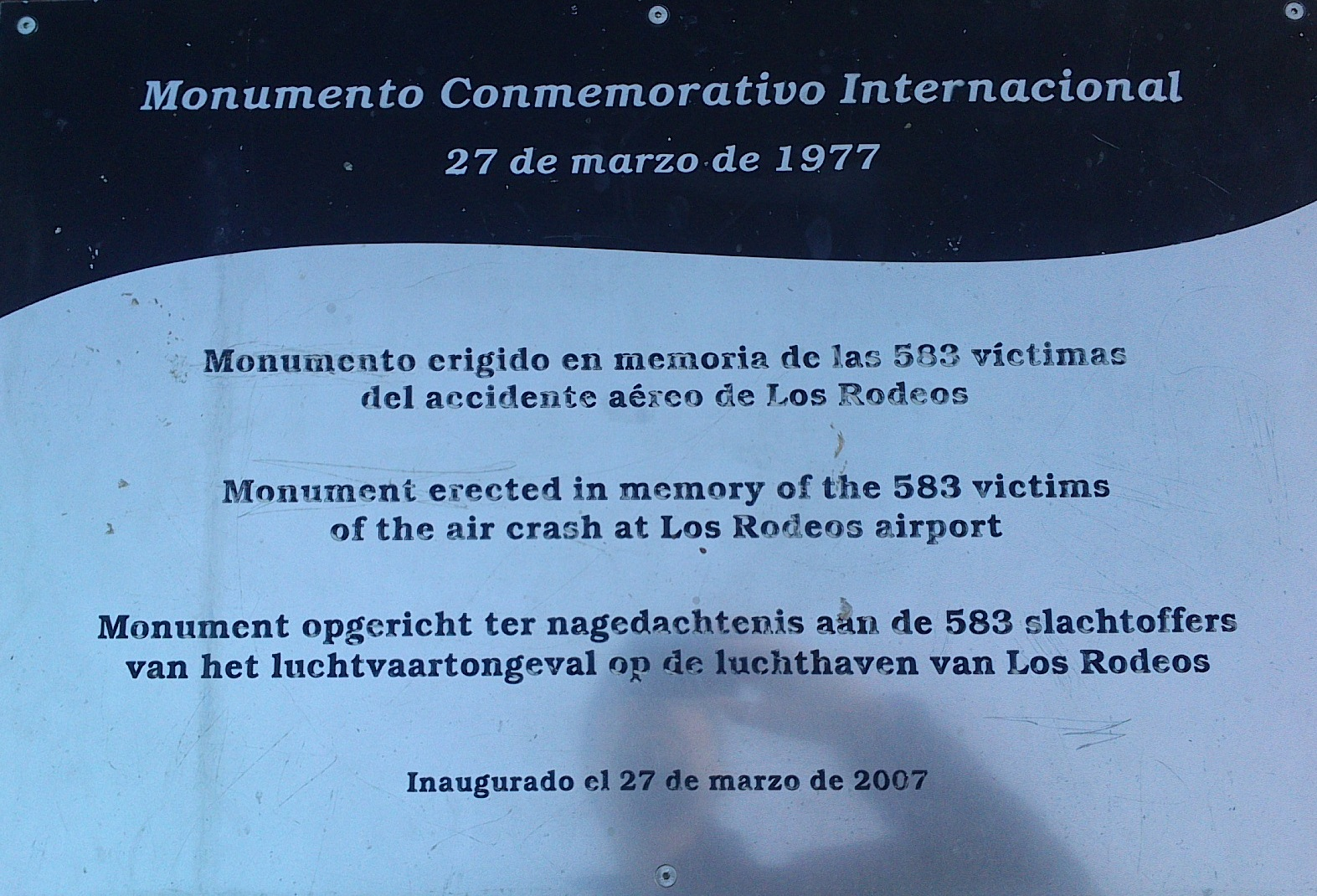
Memorial plaque

The International Tenerife Memorial March 27, 1977, erected in memory of the 583 victims of the Tenerife airport disaster, is a monument located on the Mesa Mota on the outskirts of the city of San Cristóbal de La Laguna on the island of Tenerife (Canary Islands, Spain). This location has views of Los Rodeos airport (now Tenerife North Airport) and even, on clear days, the silhouette of Mount Teide.

The monument was inaugurated on March 27, 2007 (the 30th anniversary of the disaster), in the presence of many relatives of those killed in the accident. It is shaped like a spiral staircase, with steps that connect the earth and sky. The 18-metre-high (59 ft) structure was designed by the Dutch artist Rudi van de Wint.
