= Backtaxi =

Airport ground procedure

Backtaxi (also known as backtrack) is an airport ground procedure which involves the use of any portion of a runway as a taxiway for an aircraft to taxi in the opposite direction from which it will take off or has landed. The procedure is commonly used at smaller airports and private strips which may not have separate paved taxiways parallel to the runway. It is a higher-risk procedure, as pilots may not see, or hear the radio transmissions from, aircraft taxiing on the runway.

At controlled airports, take-off or landing clearances do not authorize the pilot to reverse course and backtrack along the runway, unless specified by air traffic control. At uncontrolled airports, pilots are recommended to broadcast their intentions while backtracking in the interest of safety; for example, the statement "Entering and backtracking runway 36" would indicate the aircraft is taxiing along a magnetic heading of 180 degrees, against the flow of traffic.

An infamous and rare example of where backtracking was used for large commercial aircraft was the Tenerife airport disaster, where two Boeing 747s at Tenerife North Airport were required to backtaxi in order to position themselves for take-off. The ramps and taxiways were occupied by numerous parked aircraft which had been diverted as a result of a bomb threat at another airport.
