= English for specific purposes =

Subset of English as a second or foreign language

English for specific purposes (ESP) is a subset of English as a second or foreign language. It usually refers to teaching the English language to university students or people already in employment, with reference to the particular vocabulary and skills they need. As with any language taught for specific purposes, a given course of ESP will focus on one occupation or profession, such as Technical English, Scientific English, English for medical professionals, English for waiters, English for tourism, etc. Despite the seemingly limited focus, a course of ESP can have a wide-ranging impact, as is the case with Environmental English.

English for academic purposes, taught to students before or during their degrees, is one sort of ESP, as is Business English. Aviation English is taught to pilots, air traffic controllers and civil aviation cadets to enable clear radio communications.

== Definition ==
=== Absolute characteristics ===
1. ESP is defined to meet psychological needs of the learners and how they will respond to temptations (Maslow's hierarchy of needs).
2. ESP makes use of underlying methodology and activities of the discipline it serves.
3. ESP is centered on the language appropriate to these activities in terms of grammar, lexis, register, study skills, discourse and genre.

=== Variable characteristics ===
Strevens' (1988) ESP may be, but is not necessarily:

1. Restricted as to the language skills to be learned (e.g. reading only);
2. Not taught according to any pre-ordained methodology (pp. 1–2)

Dudley-Evans & St John (1998)

1. ESP may be related to or designed for specific disciplines;(Dabong, 2019)
2. ESP may use, in specific teaching situations, a different methodology from that of general English;
3. ESP is likely to be designed for adult learners, either at a tertiary level institution or in a professional work situation. It could, however, be for learners at secondary school level;
4. ESP is generally designed for intermediate or advanced students;
5. Most ESP courses assume some basic knowledge of the language system, but it can be used with beginners (pp. 4–5)

== Teaching ==
ESP is taught in many universities of the world. Many professional associations of teachers of English (e.g., TESOL and IATEFL) have ESP sections. Much attention is devoted to ESP course design. ESP teaching has much in common with English as a foreign or second language and English for academic purposes (EAP). Quickly developing Business English can be considered as part of a larger concept of English for specific purposes.

ESP is different from standard English teaching in the fact that the one doing the teaching not only has to be proficient in standard English, but they also must be knowledgeable in a technical field. When doctors of foreign countries learn English, they need to learn the names of their tools, naming conventions, and methodologies of their profession before one can ethically perform surgery. ESP courses for medicine would be relevant for any medical profession, just as how learning electrical engineering would be beneficial to a foreign engineer. Some ESP scholars recommend a "two layer" ESP course: the first covering all generic knowledge in the specific field of study, and then a second layer that would focus on the specifics of the specialization of the individual.

== See also ==
- Test of English for Aviation
- EAP – English for academic purposes
- English for Specific Purposes World (online journal)
- Functional English
- Rally English

== Notes ==
- Hutchinson, T. & A. Francisco. 1987. English for Specific Purposes: A learning-centered approach. Cambridge: Cambridge University Press.
- Eric.ed.gov, Dudley-Evans, Tony. An Overview of ESP in the 1990s. In: The Japan Conference on English for Specific Purposes Proceedings (Aizuwakamatsu City, Fukushima, Japan, November 8, 1997)
- Amazon.co.uk, Dudley-Evans, Tony (1998). Developments in English for Specific Purposes: A multi-disciplinary approach. Cambridge University Press.
- Ideas and Options in English for Specific Purposes 2006 ISBN 978-0-8058-4418-4 Developmentalpsychologyarena.com, Helen Basturkmen. Ideas and Options in English for Specific Purposes. Published by: Routledge, 2005
- Eric.ed.gov, The Apitong 3rd floor on English for Specific Purposes Proceedings (Aizuwakamatsu City, Fukushima, November 8, 1997) Orr, Thomas, Ed.
