= Aviation communication =

Methods of relaying information to and from aircraft

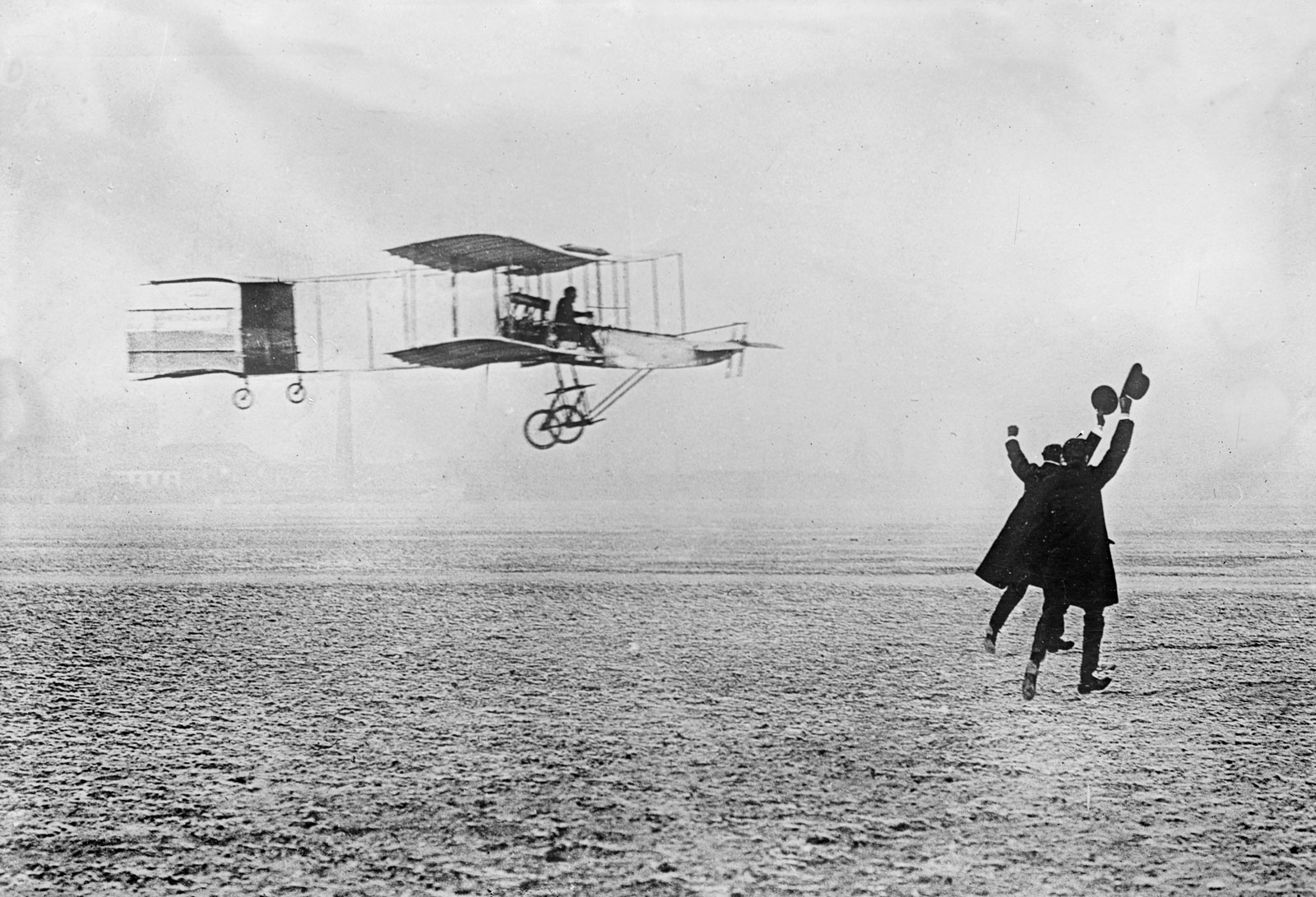
The earliest communication with aircraft was by visual signalling

Aviation communication refers to the conversing of two or more aircraft. Aircraft are constructed in such a way that make it very difficult to see beyond what is directly in front of them. As safety is a primary focus in aviation, communication methods such as wireless radio are an effective way for aircraft to communicate with the necessary personnel. Aviation is an international industry and as a result involves multiple languages. The International Civil Aviation Organization (ICAO) deemed English the official language of aviation. The industry considers that some pilots may not be fluent English speakers and as a result pilots are obligated to participate in an English proficiency test.

== Background ==
Aviation communication is the means by which aircraft crews connect with other aircraft and people on the ground to relay information. Aviation communication is a crucial component pertaining to the successful functionality of aircraft movement both on the ground and in the air. Increased communication reduces the risk of an accident.

During the early stages of aviation, it was assumed that skies were so big and empty that it was impossible that two planes would collide. In 1956 two planes famously crashed over the Grand Canyon, which sparked the creation of the Federal Aviation Administration (FAA). Aviation was roaring during the Jet Age and as a result, communication technologies needed to be developed. This was initially seen as a very difficult task: ground controls used visual aids to provide signals to pilots in the air. With the advent of portable radios small enough to be placed in planes, pilots were able to communicate with people on the ground. With later developments, pilots were then able to converse air-to-ground and air-to-air. Today, aviation communication relies heavily on the use of many systems. Planes are outfitted with the newest radio and GPS systems, as well as Internet and video capabilities.

English is the main language used by the aviation industry; the use of aviation English is regulated by the International Civil Aviation Organization (ICAO).

== Early systems ==
Flight was considered a foreign concept until the Wright Brothers successfully completed the world's first human flight in 1903. The industry grew rapidly and ground crews initially relied on coloured paddles, signal flares, hand signs, and other visual aids to communicate with incoming and outgoing aircraft. Although these methods were effective for ground crews, they offered no way for pilots to communicate back. As wireless telegraphy technologies developed alongside the growth of aviation during the first decade of the twentieth century, wireless telegraph systems were used to send messages in Morse code, first from ground-to-air and later air-to-ground. With this technology, planes were able to call in accurate artillery fire and act as forward observers in warfare.

In 1911, wireless telegraphy was put into operational use in the Italo-Turkish War. In 1912, the Royal Flying Corps had begun experimenting with "wireless telegraphy" in aircraft. Lieutenant B.T James was a leading pioneer of wireless radio in aircraft. In the spring of 1913, James had begun to experiment with radios in a B.E.2A. James managed to successfully increase the efficiency of wireless radio before he was shot down and killed by anti-aircraft fire on July 13, 1915.

Nonetheless, wireless communication systems in aircraft remained experimental and would take years to successfully develop a practical prototype. The early radios were heavy in weight and were unreliable; additionally, ground forces rarely used radio because signals were easily intercepted and targeted by opposing forces. At the beginning of World War I, aircraft were not typically equipped with wireless equipment. Instead, soldiers used large panel cut outs to distinguish friendly forces. These cut outs could also be used as a directional device to help pilots navigate back to friendly and familiar airfields.

In April 1915, Captain J.M. Furnival was the first person to hear a voice from the ground from Major Prince who said, "If you can hear me now, it will be the first time speech has ever been communicated to an aeroplane in flight." In June 1915, the world's first air-to-ground voice transmission took place at Brooklands, United Kingdom, over about 20 miles. Ground-to-air was initially by Morse code, but it is believed 2-way voice communications were available and installed by July 1915. By early 1916, the Marconi Company in Britain started production of air-to-ground radio transmitters/receivers which were used in the war over France.

In 1917, AT&T invented the first American air-to-ground radio transmitter. They tested this device at Langley Field in Virginia and found it was a viable technology. In May 1917, General George Squier of the U.S. Army Signal Corps contacted AT&T to develop an air-to-ground radio with a range of 2,000 yards. By July 4 of that same year, AT&T technicians achieved two-way communication between pilots and ground personnel. This allowed ground personnel to communicate directly with pilots using their voices instead of Morse code. Though few of these devices saw service in the war, they proved this was a viable and valuable technology worthy of refinement and advancement.

== Interwar ==
Following World War I new technology was developed to increase the range and performance of the radios being used to communicate with planes in the air. In December 1919 a year after the end of World War I, Hugh Trenchard, 1st Viscount Trenchard, a senior officer in the Royal Flying Corps (RFC) later Royal Air Force (RAF), produced a report on the permanent organisation and operations of the RAF in peacetime in which he argued that if the air force officer was not to be a chauffeur, and nothing more, then navigation, meteorology, photography and wireless were necessities.

It was not until 1930 that airborne radios were reliable enough and had enough power to make them effective; and it was this year that the International Commission for Aerial Navigation agreed that all aircraft carrying 10 or more passengers should carry wireless equipment. Prior to this, only military aircraft designated for scout missions required radios. The operating distance of radios increased much slower than the distance planes were able to travel. After an original two mile range for the two-way radio systems tested by 1917 had extended to ranges of an average of 20 miles, which remained a practical limit for medium sized aircraft. In terms of air traffic control, this resulted in a plane's messages having to bounce from airfield to airfield in order to get to its intended recipient. As the speed of planes increased, this resulted in a plane reaching its destination before the message announcing its departure.

On 15 November 1938, the Army Airways Communications System (AACS) was established. This was a point-to-point communications system used by the US Army Air Corps, that allowed army air fields to remain in contact with planes throughout their entire flight. It could also be used to disseminate weather reports and orders to military aircraft and act as an air traffic control for arrivals and departures at military airfields. As technology increased, systems such as the AACS expanded and spread across the globe as other militaries and civilian services developed their own systems of air control.

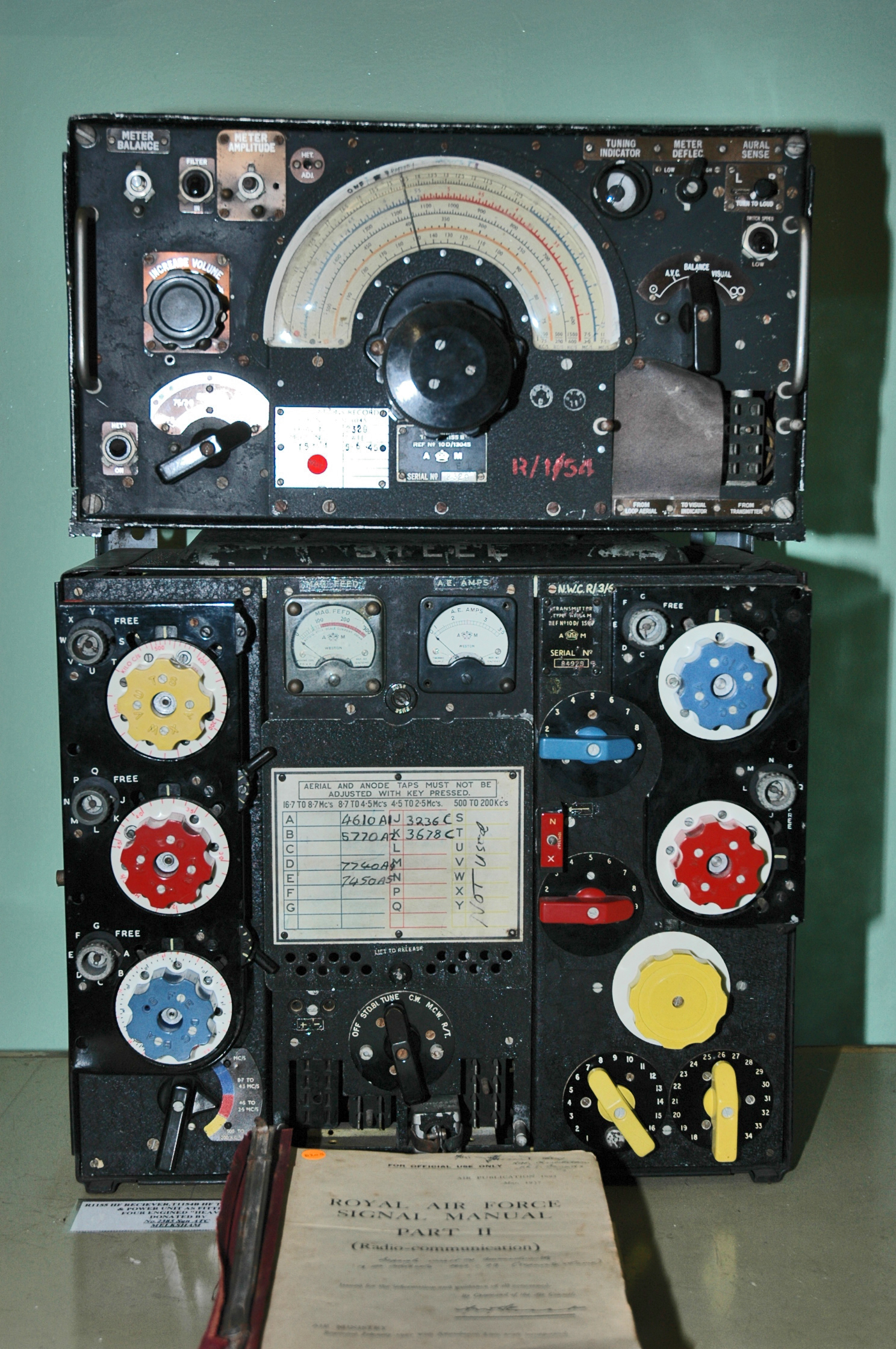
The R1155/T1154 combination used by the RAF in WWII

== World War II ==
The development of radar in the mid-1930s proved a great advance in air-to-ground communication. Radar could be used to track planes in the air and determine distance, direction, speed and even type of aircraft. This allowed for better air traffic control as well as navigation aids for pilots. Radar also proved to be a valuable tool in targeting for bombers. Radar stations on the coast of Britain could aim two radar beams from separate locations on the coast towards Germany. By aligning the two radar beams to intersect over the desired target, a town or factory for example, an aircraft could then follow one radar signal until it intersected with the other where it would then know to drop bombs.

The Royal Air Force used the R1155/T1154 receiver/transmitter combination in most of its larger aircraft, particularly the Avro Lancaster and Short Sunderland. Single seat aircraft such as the Spitfire and Hurricane were equipped mostly with the TR1143 set. Other systems employed were Eureka and the S-Phone, which enabled Special Operations Executive agents working behind enemy lines to communicate with friendly aircraft and coordinate landings and the dropping of agents and supplies.

== Error ==
Communication error can occur between pilots and between pilots and air traffic controllers due to inadequate information, unclear pronunciation or comprehensive misunderstanding.

The more information needing transfer, the more chance for error. Unclear pronunciation could happen with non-English speakers. Sometimes lack of self-confidence and motivation affects expression in communication. Misunderstanding happens with both native speakers and non-native speakers through communication, so a standard aviation language is important to improve this situation.

Sources of communication error come from: phonology (speech rate, stress, intonation, pauses), syntax (language word patterns, sentence structure), semantics, and pragmatics (language in context). Even though English is the international aviation language, native English speakers still play a role in misunderstanding and situational awareness. Both the ICAO and the Federal Aviation Administration use alternative phrases, which is confusing to both native and non-native English speakers.

The biggest problem regarding non-native English speakers' transmissions is speech rate. In order to understand alternative and unfamiliar accents, people's rate of comprehension and response slows down. Accents also affect transmissions because of the different pronunciations across languages. Some of the earlier miscommunication issues included the limitation of language-based warning systems in aircraft and insufficient English proficiency.

According to US department of transportation's report, errors between pilots and controllers include:

- Read-back/hear-back errors - the pilot reads back the clearance incorrectly and the controller fails to correct the error - accounted for 47% of the errors found in this analysis.
- No pilot read-back. A lack of a pilot read-back contributed to 25% of the errors found in this analysis.
- Hear-back Errors Type H - the controller fails to notice his or her own error in the pilot's correct read-back or fails to correct critical erroneous information in a pilot's statement of intent - accounted for 18% of the errors found in this analysis.

Generally, miscommunication is caused by mis-hearing by the pilots for 28%, pilot not responding for 20%, controller mis-hearing for 15% and 10% that controllers do not respond. Also, a professional research shows that 30% of the information will be lost during the miscommunication. Moreover, miscommunication exists in personnel with different background of linguistics is shown to be one of the major problem in miscommunication to cause aviation accidents. Avoiding or minimizing miscommunication could be achieved by standardized debriefing or an interview process, and following a checklist to supplement written data.

== English ==
The International Civil Aviation Organization established English as the international aviation language in 1951 to improve consistency, accuracy, and effectiveness of pilot - air traffic control communication. It requires that all pilots on international flights and air traffic controllers serving international airports and routes must be able to communicate in English effectively, as well as in their native language. The goal was to achieve standards that would eliminate communication error, language, and comprehension difficulties, all of which have been a major cause of operational airspace incidents. Miscommunication between pilots and air traffic control is a prominent factor in fatal airplane crashes, airspace incidents, runway incursion, and mid-air collisions.

Aviation English is the highly specialized language and sequences used by pilots, air traffic control, and other aviation personnel and it focuses on a particular pronunciation, vocabulary, grammatical structure, and discourse styles that are used in specific aviation-related contexts. The language used by pilots and air traffic controllers during radiotelephony communication can be categorized into two types: standard phraseology, and plain language repertoire. Standard phraseology is the specialized phrasing commonly used by the aviation community to effectively communicate, and plain language is a more normal language used in everyday life.

Many non-native English speaking pilots and air traffic controllers learn English during their flight training and use it in a highly practical level while safely operating an aircraft and maintaining the safety of airspace, which can be highly stressful.

=== Language proficiency requirements ===
ICAO also established the Language Proficiency Requirements to try to rectify multiple issues regarding accents, terminology, and interpretation in communication. The intention of the LPRs is to "ensure that the language proficiency of pilots and air traffic controllers is sufficient to reduce miscommunication as much as possible and to allow pilots and controllers to recognize and solve potential miscommunication when it does occur" and "that all speakers have sufficient language proficiency to handle non-routine situations." The structure of the LPR has six levels, pronunciation, structure, vocabulary, fluency, comprehension, and interactions. The implemented universal aviation English proficiency scale ranged from Level 1 to Level 6.

Beginning in March 2008, ICAO set out the requirement that all pilots flying international routes and air traffic control serving international airports and routes must be a Level 4 or above and will be continually reassessed every three years. The criteria to achieve Level 4 are as follows:

- Pronunciation: A dialect and/or accent intelligible to aeronautical community.
- Structure: Relevant grammatical structures and sentence patterns determined by language functions appropriate to the task.
- Vocabulary: Vocabulary range and accuracy used sufficiently to communicate effectively.
- Fluency: Produces stretches of language at an appropriate tempo.
- Comprehension: Comprehension accurate in common, concrete, and work-related topics and the accent used is sufficiently intelligible for the international community.
- Interactions: Responses are immediate, appropriate, and informative.

=== Non-English speakers ===
English is the aviation language used by ICAO. Usually, human factors that affect communications include two aspects: direct, meaning the error caused by the language itself, which is the problem for non English speakers, and also indirect, with the gender, age, and experience impacting the communication in aviation.

- Accent and dialect are significant problems in aviation communication. These may cause misunderstandings and result in the wrong information being conveyed.
- Command of speech structures like grammar and vocabulary can also cause problems.
- During the communication through English for non-English speakers, gender and race may affect ability to communicate with the second language which is an indirect impact on communication.
- Intonation due to signal limitations, lack of function words, standard phraseology and rapid speech rate also plague many non English speakers.

As a result, both pilots and ATCs need to have enough English ability to accomplish their tasks. Through education to help improve aviation English, participants need not only focus on the textbook, but need experience in an actual environment such as lab experience to help speakers to improve their English fluency and avoid misunderstanding which helps non-English speakers to communicate normally.

== See also ==
- Air navigation
- Airband
- Aviation English
- Ground Air Emergency Code
- Index of aviation articles
- Radiotelephony procedure
- Signal square
