= ELPAC Test =

English language proficiency test for aviation personnel

English Language Proficiency for Aeronautical Communication Test (ELPAC) is a EUROCONTROL test for aeronautical communication designed to assess ICAO English Language Proficiency for pilots and air traffic controllers, and reflects the range of tasks undertaken in air traffic control and pilot communications. The test focuses on language proficiency, not operational procedures.

== ICAO Requirements for Language Proficiency ==
The implementation of the ICAO language proficiency requirements in 2011 marked an improvement to international standardization in aviation, requiring that all air traffic controllers and pilots operating in internationally designated airspace and on international air routes demonstrate their proficiency in the language(s) they use for aeronautical communication.

In order to maintain the operational standard, air traffic controllers and pilots must achieve at least level 4 according to ICAO's language proficiency requirements. Their language proficiency is a license endorsement without which air traffic control and pilot licenses cannot be issued. ICAO Standards and Recommended Practices (SARPs) for Language Proficiency Requirements (LPR) - requires organizations worldwide to ensure that the language proficiency tests they work with are reliable, effective and appropriate for the aviation industry.

ELPAC is the first English Language Proficiency test to achieve full ICAO recognition since 2012.

== Background ==
ELPAC was developed by EUROCONTROL, in partnership with the Zurich University of Applied Sciences/ZHAW and ENOVATE A.S. (Bergen, Norway). It is designed to help Air Navigation Service Providers (ANSP), Aircraft Operators (AO), National Supervisory Authorities (NSA) and training organizations (TO) meet the ICAO language proficiency requirements.

ELPAC test development began in November 2004 following extensive feasibility studies. In February 2005 a core development team, consisting of air traffic controllers and English language experts from six countries and EUROCONTROL, began designing the test specifications and items/tasks in accordance with the ICAO language proficiency requirements.

== ELPAC test design and structure ==
ELPAC tests English language proficiency at ICAO level 4 (operational) and level 5 (extended). Both standard ICAO phraseology and plain language are included in the test. Plain language proficiency is an essential component of radiotelephony communications, as it is not possible to develop standard phraseologies to cover every conceivable situation.

There are currently two versions of ELPAC available, which were designed specifically to reflect the communicative functions of air traffic controllers and commercial pilots.

There are two papers, and candidates are required to successfully complete both:

- Listening Comprehension (also referred to as ELPAC Paper 1)
- Oral Interaction (also referred to as ELPAC Paper 2)

ELPAC Paper 1 is administered via the Internet and takes around 40 minutes to complete.

ELPAC Paper 2 is administered by two ELPAC examiners, a language expert and an operational expert, and takes around 20 minutes to complete.

== ELPAC for air traffic controllers ==
ELPAC Paper 1 (Listening Comprehension) tests the understanding of communications between pilots and controllers and between controllers and controllers in both routine and non-routine situations. The recordings are based on authentic material and range from short standard pilot transmissions to longer communications in which the controller deals with non-routine or unusual situations.

ELPAC Paper 2 (Oral Interaction) assesses the controller's proficiency through non-visual and visual communication in three tasks. This includes:

- The correct use of standard ICAO phraseology
- Switching between structured phrases, standard ICAO phraseology and plain English
- Making an appropriate response to a pilot message
- Resolving misunderstandings
- Dealing effectively with the relationship between pilot and controller
- Negotiating a developing unusual situation
- Making a verbal report in English (on an unusual non-routine situation)
- Producing extended speech in an aviation context.

== ELPAC for pilots ==
ELPAC Paper 1 (Listening Comprehension) tests the understanding of communications between pilots and controllers in both routine and non-routine situations. The recordings are based on authentic material and range from short standard pilot transmissions to longer communications in which the pilot deals with non-routine or unusual situations.

ELPAC Paper 2 (oral Interaction) assesses the pilot's proficiency through a series of different tasks. This includes:

- switching between structured phrases and plain English
- making an appropriate report on an unusual ATC-related event
- resolving misunderstandings
- effectively managing the relationship between pilot and controller
- negotiating meaning
- producing extended speech in an aviation context
- Online language proficiency test ( Level4, Level5, Level6 ) for pilots in English or German

== ELPAC Level 6 Test for air traffic controllers and pilots ==
The ELPAC level 6 test is available after the first series of language proficiency tests has been completed for organizations wishing to test their staff at ICAO level 6, which is referred to as ELPAC Paper 3.

ELPAC Paper 3 (level 6 test) assesses the air traffic controller's or pilot's proficiency at ICAO level 6, verifying through four tasks that the candidate is able to:

- understand and avoid idiomatic English
- recognize and avoid ambiguity
- use clear and concise English
- negotiate meaning
- clarify potential misunderstandings.

These requirements are in accordance with the ICAO rating scale description of a level 6 speaker. The ELPAC level 6 test can be taken only after the candidate has demonstrated ICAO level 5 first in the regular ELPAC test.

== Access ==
ELPAC is currently available to Air Navigation Service Providers, Aircraft Operators, CAAs and Training Organizations worldwide subject to a License Agreement with EUROCONTROL.

== ELPAC Preparation ==
EUROCONTROL provides a set of online sample tests that can be used by ELPAC test candidates to familiarize themselves with the ELPAC test format and task types.

- ELPAC Listening Comprehension - Paper 1
- Rated sound samples at ICAO levels 3-5

This will make candidates feel more confident; however, it is the level of English language proficiency that determines the result of the ELPAC test.

== See also ==
- SKYbrary
