= Academic English =

Part of English used for specific purposes

English for academic purposes (EAP), commonly known as Academic English, entails training students, usually in a higher education setting, to use language appropriate for study. It is one of the most common forms of English for specific purposes (ESP). It is also a course found in TAFE in Australia.

== Program ==
An EAP program focuses instruction on skills required to perform in an English-speaking academic context across core subject areas generally encountered in a college or a university setting. Programs may also include a more narrow focus on the more specific linguistic demands of a particular area of study, for example business subjects. Programs may be divided into pre-sessional courses and courses taken alongside students' other subjects. In the former case, sometimes EAP courses may be intended to raise students' general English levels so that they can enter a college or a university.

== Scores ==
In the United Kingdom, this often means endeavoring to help students get a score of 6 or above in the IELTS (International English Language Testing System) examination. In the US, this can mean helping students attain a score of 80 or greater on the TOEFL (Test of English as a Foreign Language) or more than 4 on the ITEP (International Test of English Proficiency). Outside Anglophone countries, English-medium universities may have a preparatory school where students can spend a year or two working on their English and academic skills before starting degree courses. EAP courses running alongside other degree courses may be based on the American English and Composition model, or may employ content-based instruction, either using material from the students' degree subjects or as an independent, elective-like course. These in-sessional courses may be desirable more to help students develop study skills and required academic practices than for language development.

== Units ==
In common with most language teaching, AEP instruction teaches vocabulary, grammar and the four skills (reading, writing, speaking – including pronunciation – and listening), but usually tries to tie these to the specific study needs of students; for example, a writing lesson would focus on writing essays rather than, say, business letters. Similarly, the vocabulary chosen for study tends to be based on academic texts. In addition, EAP practitioners often find that, either directly or indirectly, they are teaching study skills and often having to tackle differences in educational culture, such as differing attitudes to plagiarism. This trend has become more prominent as the numbers of foreign students attending UK universities, and other institutions across the English-speaking world, has increased over the last decade.

== Disputation ==
There is some debate amongst EAP teachers as to the best way to help students with academic English. On the one hand, students might be taught particular conventions but not expected to understand why they need to adapt their writing; a pragmatic approach. On the other hand, students might be encouraged to challenge writing conventions and only adopt them if they seem justified; a critical approach. Recently attempts have been made to try and reconcile these opposing views. A critical pragmatic approach to EAP encourages students to develop writing conventions required by colleges and universities while also encouraging them to think about the reasons why these conventions exist.

== See also ==
- Lingua franca
- Contrastive rhetoric
- English as a second language
- English studies
- Structured English Immersion, a framework for teaching English language learners in public schools
- Teaching English as a foreign language (TEFL)
