= Aeronautical phraseology =

Language used in air traffic control

Aeronautical phraseology is a set of communication rules for simplified English language communication between an air traffic controller (ATC) and the pilot in command (PIC) of an aircraft. In the majority of countries, the aeronautical phraseology in use is based on standards developed by the International Civil Aviation Organization (ICAO).

== Goals of aeronautical phraseology ==
A primary goal of concise aeronautical phraseology is to enhance communication between pilot and control tower.

Brevity is a further goal, since shorter communications segments mean the airwaves are available for other aircraft to contact the ATC.

The use of slang, jargon and chatting are strongly discouraged.

== Structure ==
Radio contacts using aeronautical phraseology begin with an identifier call sign in the case of a pilot, or the name of the airport in the case of the control tower.

== See also ==
- List of aviation, aerospace and aeronautical abbreviations
- FAA Order 7110.65
- Brevity code
- Procedure word
- Radiotelephony procedure
