= Tenerife airport disaster =

1977 runway collision in the Canary Islands

Tenerife airport disaster KLM Flight 4805 · Pan Am Flight 1736
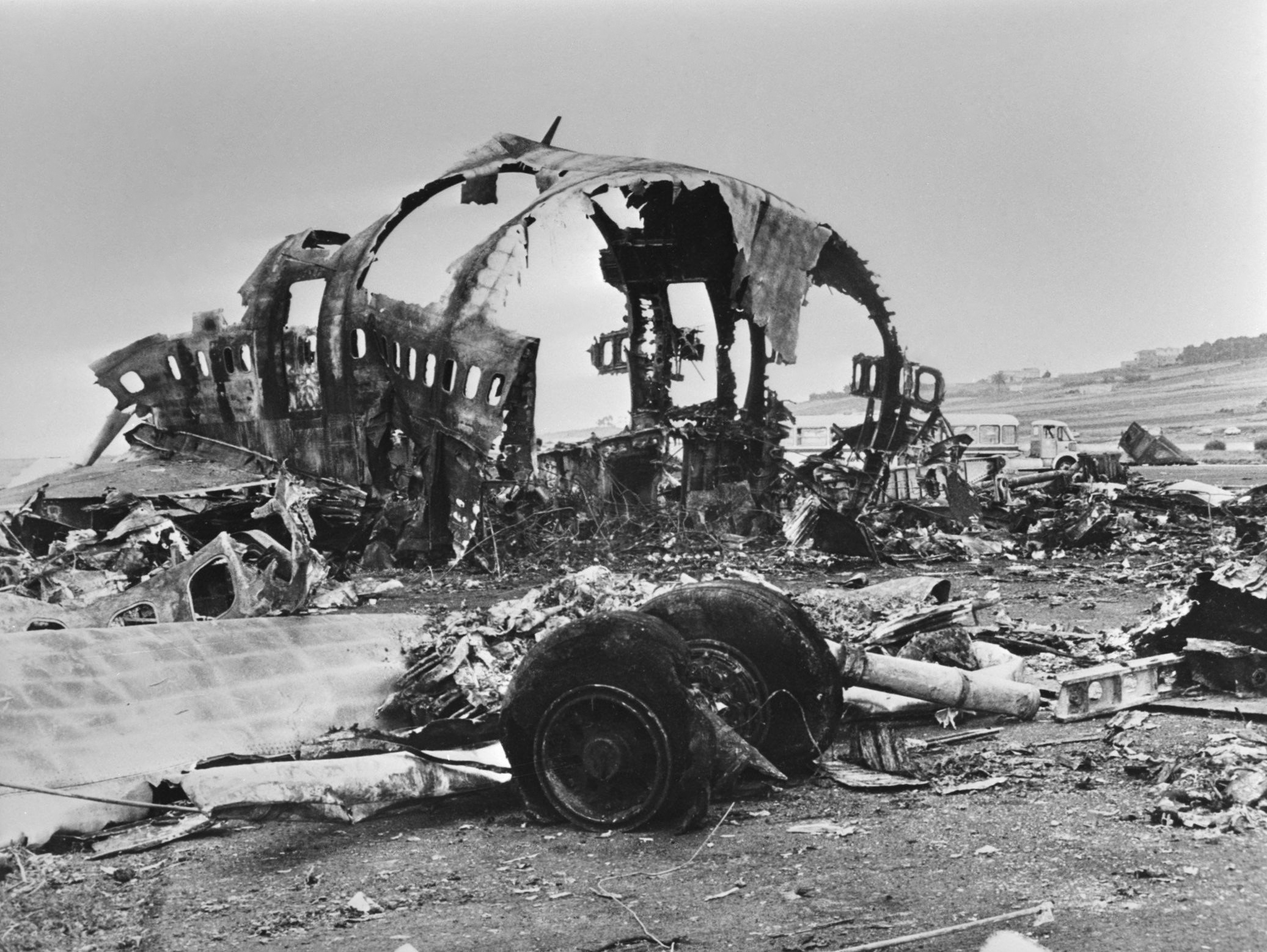
- Wreckage of KLM Flight 4805 at Los Rodeos Airport

Accident
- Date: 27 March 1977
- Summary: Runway collision due to pilot and ATC error in poor visibility
- Site: Los Rodeos Airport, Tenerife, Canary Islands, Spain; 28°28′53.94″N 16°20′18.24″W
- Total fatalities: 583
- Total injuries: 61
- Total survivors: 61

First aircraft
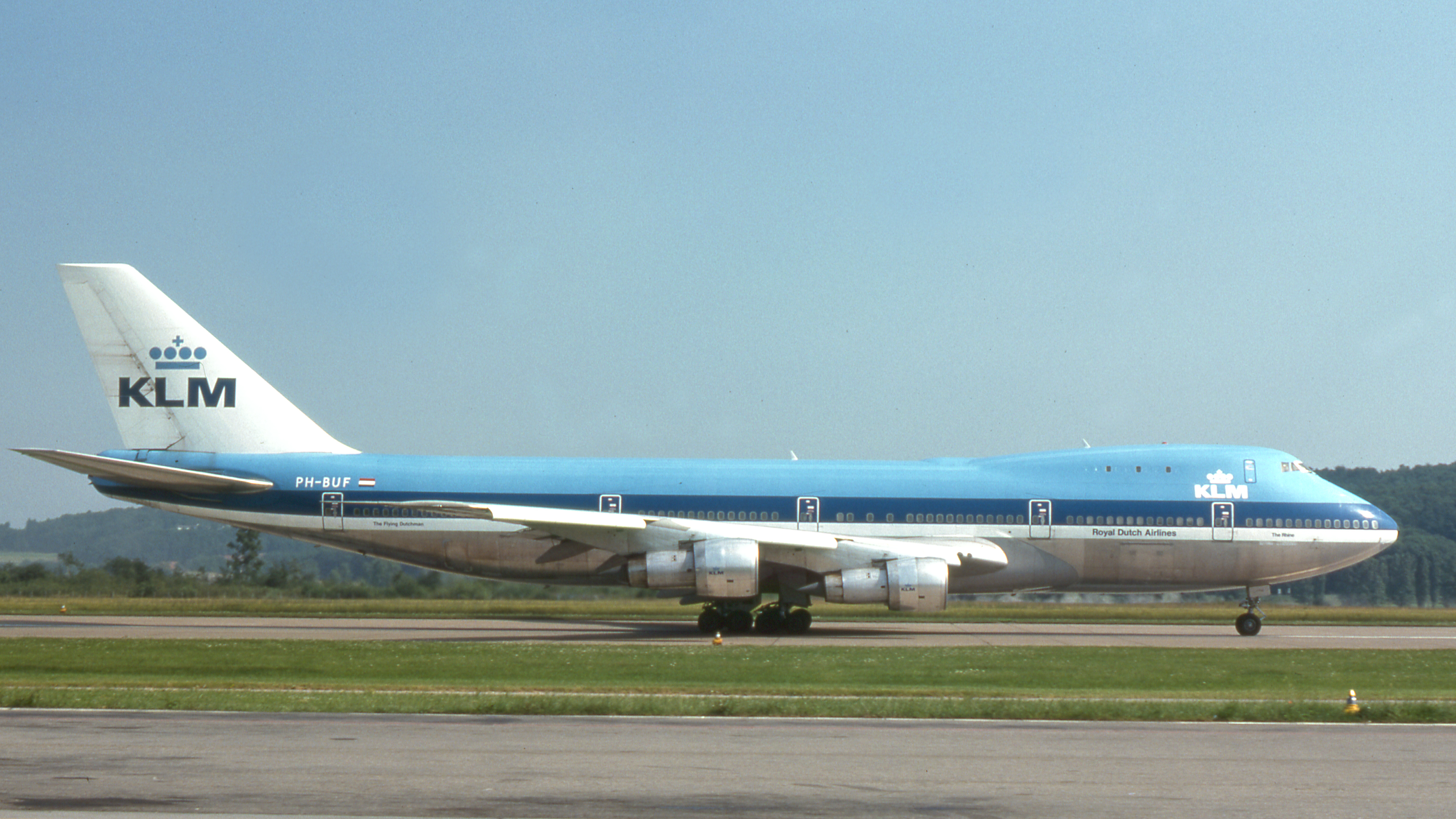
- PH-BUF, the KLM Boeing 747-206B involved in the collision
- Type: Boeing 747-206B (Note: Boeing assigned a customer code for airline companies who would buy their aircraft. The code for KLM is "06".)
- Name: Rijn / The Rhine
- Operator: KLM
- IATA flight No.: KL4805
- ICAO flight No.: KLM4805
- Call sign: KLM 4805
- Registration: PH-BUF
- Flight origin: Amsterdam Airport Schiphol, Amsterdam, Netherlands
- Destination: Gran Canaria Airport, Gran Canaria, Canary Islands, Spain
- Occupants: 248
- Passengers: 234
- Crew: 14
- Fatalities: 248
- Survivors: 0

Second aircraft
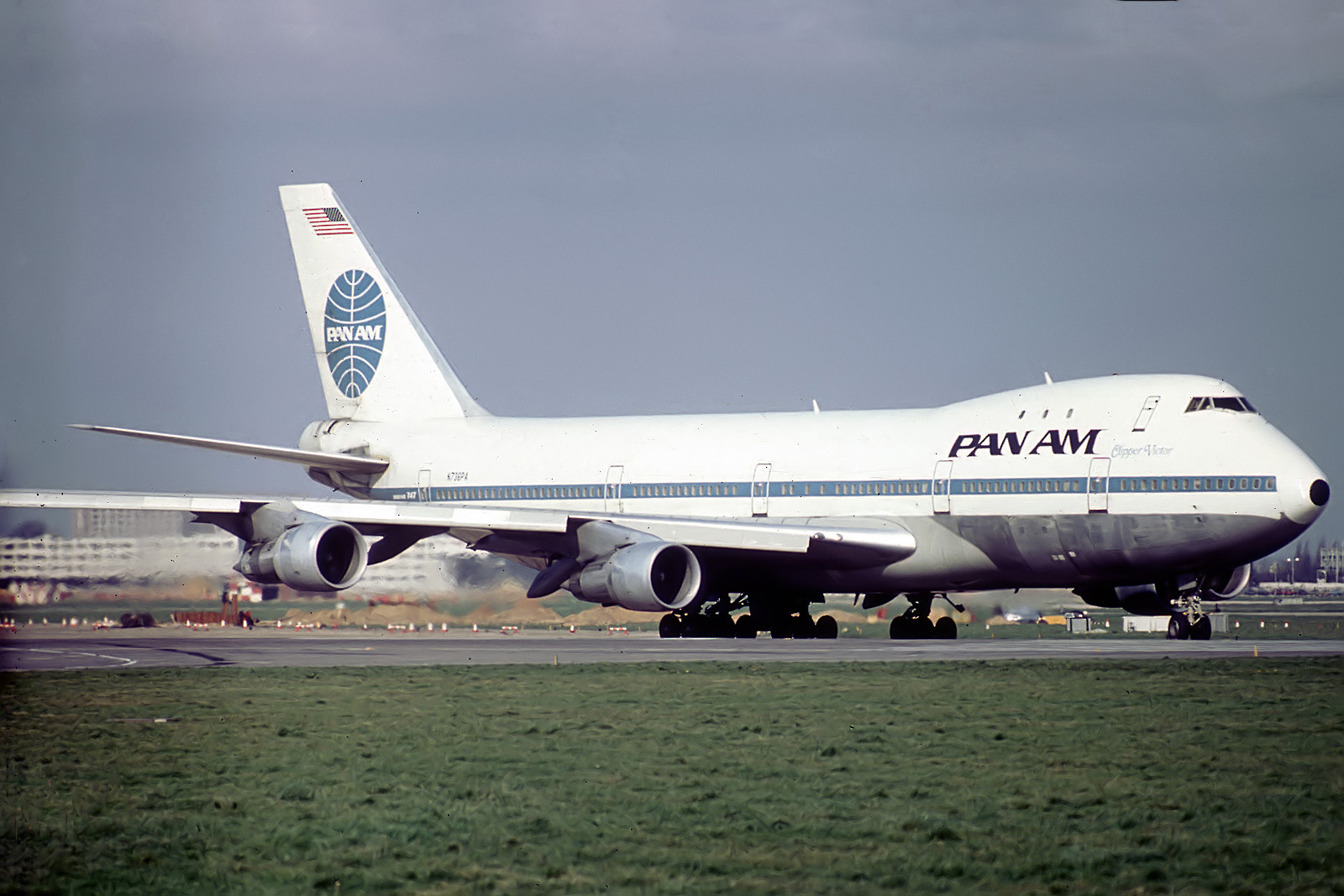
- N736PA, the Pan Am Boeing 747-121 involved, pictured three weeks before the collision
- Type: Boeing 747-121 (Note: Boeing assigned a customer code for airline companies who would buy their aircraft. The code for Pan Am is "21".)
- Name: Clipper Victor
- Operator: Pan American World Airways
- IATA flight No.: PA1736
- ICAO flight No.: PAA1736
- Call sign: CLIPPER 1736
- Registration: N736PA
- Flight origin: Los Angeles International Airport, Los Angeles, United States
- Stopover: John F. Kennedy International Airport, New York City, United States
- Destination: Gran Canaria Airport, Gran Canaria, Canary Islands, Spain
- Occupants: 396
- Passengers: 380
- Crew: 16
- Fatalities: 335
- Injuries: 61
- Survivors: 61

On March 27, 1977, two Boeing 747 passenger jets collided on a runway at Los Rodeos Airport on the Spanish island of Tenerife, killing 583 people and injuring 61 others in the deadliest accident in aviation history. (Note: American Airlines Flight 11 and United Airlines Flight 175 were intentionally flown into the World Trade Center in New York City, meaning those disasters are not considered accidents.)

The incident occurred at 17:06 GMT (UTC +0) in dense fog, when KLM Flight 4805 initiated its takeoff run, colliding with the right side of Pan Am Flight 1736, which was on the runway. The impact and the resulting fire killed all 248 people on board the KLM plane and 335 of the 396 people on board the Pan Am plane, with all 61 survivors being in the front section of the aircraft.

The two aircraft had landed at Los Rodeos earlier that Sunday and were among a number of aircraft diverted to Los Rodeos due to a bomb explosion at their intended destination of Gran Canaria Airport. Los Rodeos had become congested with parked planes blocking the only taxiway, forcing departing aircraft to taxi on the runway. Patches of thick fog were drifting across the airfield, so visibility was greatly reduced for pilots and the control tower.

An investigation by Spanish authorities concluded that the primary cause of the accident was the KLM captain's decision to take off believing that air traffic control (ATC) had issued takeoff clearance and that the Pan Am Boeing had cleared the runway, despite the latter radioing that they would "report when clear of the runway". Dutch investigators placed a greater emphasis on a mutual misunderstanding in radio communications between the KLM crew and ATC, but ultimately KLM admitted that its crew was responsible for the accident and the airline agreed to financially compensate the relatives of all of the victims.

The accident had a lasting influence on the industry, highlighting in particular the vital importance of using standard phraseology in radio communications. Cockpit procedures were also reviewed, contributing to the establishment of crew resource management as a fundamental part of airline pilots' training. The captain is no longer considered infallible, and combined crew input is encouraged during aircraft operations.

== Background ==
Tenerife was an unscheduled stop for both flights. Their destination was Gran Canaria Airport (also known as Las Palmas Airport or Gando Airport), serving Las Palmas on the nearby island of Gran Canaria.

=== KLM Flight 4805 ===
KLM captain Jacob Veldhuyzen van Zanten featured in a 1977 advertisement for the airline

KLM Flight 4805 was a charter flight for Holland International Travel Group and had arrived from Amsterdam Airport Schiphol, Netherlands. Its cockpit crew consisted of Captain Jacob Veldhuyzen van Zanten (age 50), First Officer Klaas Meurs (42), and Flight Engineer Willem Schreuder (48). At the time of the accident, Veldhuyzen van Zanten was KLM's chief flight instructor, with 11,700 flight hours, of which 1,545 hours were on the 747. Meurs had 9,200 flight hours, of which 95 hours were on the 747. Schreuder had 17,031 flight hours, of which 543 hours were on the 747.

The aircraft was a Boeing 747-206B, registration PH-BUF, named Rijn (Rhine). The KLM jet was carrying 14 crew members and 235 passengers, including 52 children and the three employees from Holland International who lived on the different islands in the Canaries. Most of the KLM passengers were Dutch; also on board were four Germans, two Austrians, and two Americans. After the aircraft landed at Tenerife, the passengers were transported to the airport terminal. One of the inbound passengers, Robina van Lanschot, a tour guide who worked at Holland International, lived on the island with her boyfriend and chose not to re-board the 747, leaving 234 passengers on board.

=== Pan Am Flight 1736 ===
Pan Am Flight 1736 was also a charter flight, by the Greek shipping company Royal Cruise Line. It had originated at Los Angeles International Airport, with an intermediate stop at New York City's John F. Kennedy International Airport. The aircraft was a Boeing 747-121, registration N736PA, named Clipper Victor. Of the 380 passengers, who were mostly of retirement age but including two children, plus the two Royal Cruise Line employees, 14 had boarded in New York, where the crew was also changed. All but five passengers onboard the aircraft were Americans; the non-American passengers were all Canadian nationals. They were on their way to board the cruise ship Golden Odyssey for a 14-day trip across the Mediterranean.

The new crew consisted of Captain Victor Grubbs (age 56), First Officer Robert Bragg (39), Flight Engineer George Warns (46), and 13 flight attendants. At the time of the accident, Grubbs had 21,043 hours of flight time, of which 564 hours were on the 747. Bragg had 10,800 flight hours, of which 2,796 hours were on the 747. Warns had 15,210 flight hours, of which 559 hours were on the 747.

Clipper Victor was a historic plane, as it was the first Boeing 747 to operate a commercial airline flight when it flew from John F. Kennedy Airport to London Heathrow on 21 January 1970. On 2 August 1970, in its first year of service, it also became the first 747 to be hijacked: en route between JFK and Luis Muñoz Marín International Airport in San Juan, Puerto Rico. It was diverted to José Martí International Airport in Havana, Cuba.

== Accident ==
=== Diversion of aircraft to Los Rodeos ===
Both flights had been routine until they approached the islands. At 13:15, a bomb planted by the separatist Canary Islands Independence Movement exploded in the terminal of Gran Canaria Airport, injuring eight people. Due to the threat of a second bomb, the civil aviation authorities closed the airport temporarily after the initial explosion, and all incoming flights bound for Gran Canaria were diverted to Los Rodeos, including the two aircraft involved in the disaster. The Pan Am crew indicated that they would prefer to circle in a holding pattern until landing clearance was given (they had enough fuel to safely stay in the air for two more hours), but they were ordered to divert to Tenerife.

Los Rodeos was a regional airport that could not easily accommodate all of the traffic diverted from Gran Canaria, which included five large airliners. The airport had only one runway and one major taxiway running parallel to it, with four short taxiways connecting the two. While waiting for Gran Canaria Airport to reopen, the diverted planes took up so much space that they had to park on the long taxiway, making it unavailable for the purpose of taxiing. Instead, departing aircraft needed to taxi along the runway to position themselves for takeoff, a procedure known as a backtaxi or backtrack.

The authorities reopened Gran Canaria Airport once the bomb threat had been contained. The Pan Am plane was ready to depart from Tenerife, but access to the runway was obstructed by the KLM plane and a refueling vehicle; the KLM captain had decided to fully refuel at Los Rodeos instead of Las Palmas, apparently to save time. The Pan Am aircraft was unable to maneuver around the refueling KLM in order to reach the runway for takeoff, due to a lack of safe clearance between the two planes, which was just 3.7 meters (12 ft). The refueling took about 35 minutes, after which the passengers were brought back to the aircraft. The search for a missing Dutch family of four, where the two Dutch children were in the runway who had not returned to the waiting KLM plane, delayed the flight even further. Additionally, Robina van Lanschot, a tour guide from Holland International, had chosen not to reboard for the flight to Las Palmas, because she lived on Tenerife and thought it impractical to fly to Gran Canaria only to return to Tenerife the next day. She was therefore not on the KLM plane when the accident happened, and was the only survivor of those who flew from Amsterdam to Tenerife on Flight 4805.

=== Taxiing and takeoff preparations ===
The Los Rodeos tower instructed the KLM plane to taxi down the entire length of the runway and then make a 180° turn to get into takeoff position. While the KLM was backtaxiing on the runway, the controller asked the flight crew to report when it was ready to copy the ATC clearance. Because the flight crew was performing the checklist, copying the clearance was postponed until the aircraft was in takeoff position.

Simplified map of runway, taxiways, and aircraft. The red star indicates the location of impact. Not to scale.

Shortly afterward, the Pan Am was instructed to follow the KLM down the same runway, exit it by taking the third exit on the left and then use the parallel taxiway. Initially, the crew was unclear as to whether the controller had told them to take the first or third exit. The crew asked for clarification and the controller responded emphatically by replying: "The third one, sir; one, two, three; third, third one." The crew began the taxi and proceeded to identify the unmarked taxiways using an airport diagram as they reached them.

The crew successfully identified the first two taxiways (C1 and C2), but their discussion in the cockpit indicated that they had not sighted the third taxiway (C3), which they had been instructed to use. There were no markings or signs to identify the runway exits and they were in conditions of poor visibility. The Pan Am crew appeared to remain unsure of their position on the runway until the collision, which occurred near the intersection with the fourth taxiway (C4).

The angle of the third taxiway would have required the plane to perform a 148° turn, which would lead back toward the still-crowded main apron. At the end of C3, the Pan Am would have to make another 148° turn to continue taxiing toward the start of the runway, similar to a mirrored letter Z; taxiway C4 would have required two 35° turns instead. A study carried out by the Air Line Pilots Association (ALPA) after the accident concluded that making the second 148° turn at the end of taxiway C3 would have been "a practical impossibility". The official report from the Spanish authorities explained that the controller instructed the Pan Am aircraft to use the third taxiway because this was the earliest exit that they could take to reach the unobstructed section of the parallel taxiway. These instructions issued by the airport controllers indicated their lack of familiarity with the difficulty of handling large aircraft such as the 747. In an interview years later, First Officer Bragg said he believed that the airport controllers saw the plane pass the first taxiway and their instructions to turn on the third taxiway were intended to mean the third taxiway they saw after the first one, which would have been taxiway C4.

=== Weather conditions at Los Rodeos ===
Los Rodeos airport is at 633 meters (2,077 ft) above sea level, which gives rise to weather conditions that differ from those at many other airports. Clouds at 600 m (2,000 ft) above ground level at the nearby coast are at ground level at Los Rodeos. Drifting clouds of different densities cause wildly varying visibilities, from unhindered at one moment to below the legal minimum the next. The collision took place in a high-density cloud.

The Pan Am crew found themselves in poor and rapidly deteriorating visibility almost as soon as they entered the runway. According to the ALPA report, as the Pan Am aircraft taxied to the runway, the visibility was about 500 m (1,600 ft). Shortly after they turned onto the runway it decreased to less than 100 m (330 ft).

Meanwhile, the KLM plane was still in good visibility, but with clouds blowing down the runway toward them. The aircraft completed its 180-degree turn in relatively clear weather and lined up on Runway 30. The next cloud was 900 m (3,000 ft) down the runway and moving toward the aircraft at about 12 knots (14 mph; 22 km/h).

=== Communication misunderstandings ===
Cockpit and ATC tower communications
These communications are taken from the cockpit voice recorders of both aircraft, as well as from the Tenerife control tower's tapes.

1705:36–1706:50

1705:36.7

[KLM first officer completes pre-flight checklist. KLM 4805 is now at the end of the runway, in position for departure.]

1705:41.5

KLM FIRST OFFICER Wait a minute, we don't have an ATC clearance. [This statement is apparently a response to an advancing of the throttles in the KLM.]
KLM CAPTAIN No, I know that, go ahead, ask.

1705:44.6–1705:50.8

KLM FIRST OFFICER (RADIO) The KLM four eight zero five is now ready for take-off and we are waiting for our ATC clearance.

1705:53.4–1706:08.1

TENERIFE TOWER KLM eight seven zero five [sic] you are cleared to the Papa beacon, climb to and maintain flight level nine zero, right turn after takeoff, proceed with heading four zero until intercepting the three two five radial from Las Palmas VOR.

1706:07.4

KLM CAPTAIN Yes.

1706:09.6–1706:17.8

KLM FIRST OFFICER (RADIO) Ah roger, sir, we are cleared to the Papa beacon flight level nine zero, right turn out zero four zero until intercepting the three two five. We are now at take-off [or "uh..taking off"].

1706:11.1

[KLM brakes released.]

1706:12.3

KLM CAPTAIN We gaan ... check thrust. [We're going ... check thrust.]

1706:14.0

[Engine acceleration audible in KLM cockpit.]

1706:18.2–1706:21.2

TENERIFE TOWER OK.... Stand by for take-off, I will call you. [Only the start of this message could be heard clearly by the KLM crew due to radio interference.]

1706:19.3

PAN AM CAPTAIN No... uh.

1706:20.3

PAN AM FIRST OFFICER (RADIO) And we're still taxiing down the runway, the clipper one seven three six. [This message is not heard completely clearly by the KLM crew due to radio interference.]

1706:25.5

TENERIFE TOWER Ah, Papa Alpha one seven three six, report the runway clear.

1706:29.6

PAN AM FIRST OFFICER (RADIO) OK, we'll report when (we are) clear.

1706:31.7

TENERIFE TOWER Thank you. [This was the last radio communication involving the two aircraft. Everything that follows is intra-cockpit communication among the respective crews.]

1706:32–1706:40

1706:32.1

PAN AM CAPTAIN Let's get the hell out of here.

1706:32.4

KLM FLIGHT ENGINEER Is hij er niet af dan? [Is he not clear, then?]

1706:34.1

KLM CAPTAIN Wat zeg je? [What do you say?]

1706:34.2

KLM UNKNOWN Yup.

1706:34.7

KLM FLIGHT ENGINEER Is hij er niet af, die Pan American? [Is he not clear, that Pan American?]

1706:34.9

PAN AM FIRST OFFICER Yeah, he's anxious, isn't he?

1706:35.7

KLM CAPTAIN Jawel. [Oh yes. (emphatic)]

1706:36.2

PAN AM FLIGHT ENGINEER Yeah, after he held us up for an hour and a half, that bastard. Now he's in a rush.

1706:40–1706:50

1706:40.5

[Pan Am captain sees the KLM's landing lights at approx. 700 m.]

1706:40.6

PAN AM CAPTAIN There he is ... look at him. Goddamn that son-of-a-bitch is coming!

1706:43.5

KLM FIRST OFFICER V-1.

1706:44.0

[PH-BUF (KLM 4805) starts rotation.]

1706:45.9

PAN AM FIRST OFFICER Get off! Get off! Get off!

1706:47.4

KLM CAPTAIN Oh shit!

1706:48

PAN AM CAPTAIN Oh god damn!

1706:49.7

PH-BUF (KLM 4805) records sound of collision.

1706:50

N736PA (Pan Am 1736) records sound of collision.

Immediately after lining up, the KLM captain advanced the throttles and the aircraft started to move forward. Meurs advised him that ATC clearance had not yet been given and Veldhuyzen van Zanten responded: "No, I know that. Go ahead, ask." Meurs then radioed the tower that they were "ready for takeoff" and "waiting for our ATC clearance". ATC radioed the KLM aircraft (addressing them by the wrong call sign, although the KLM still interpreted the transmission as theirs), providing instructions that specified the route that the aircraft was to follow after takeoff, but did not clear them for takeoff. To add to the confusion, the controller had used the word "takeoff" in his clearance, potentially convincing Veldhuyzen van Zanten that a takeoff clearance had been issued.

Meurs read the flight clearance back to the controller, completing the readback with the statement "We are now at takeoff", although it is still not known whether "We are at takeoff" or "We are taking off" was said. Veldhuyzen van Zanten interrupted the first officer's readback with the comment "We're going."

The controller, who could not see the runway due to the fog and did not have any ground radar to use at the airport, initially responded with "OK" (terminology that is nonstandard), which reinforced the KLM captain's misinterpretation that they had takeoff clearance. The controller's response of "OK" to the first officer's non-standard statement that they were "now at takeoff" was likely due to his misinterpreting that the aircraft was in takeoff position and ready to begin the roll when takeoff clearance was received, but not in the process of taking off. The controller then immediately added, "Stand by for takeoff; I will call you", indicating that he had not intended the instruction to be interpreted as a takeoff clearance.

A simultaneous radio call from the Pan Am crew caused mutual interference on the radio frequency, which was audible in the KLM cockpit as a three-second-long shrill sound (or heterodyne). This caused the KLM crew to miss the latter portion of the tower's response. The Pan Am crew's transmission was "We're still taxiing down the runway, Clipper 1736!" This message was also blocked by the interference and inaudible to the KLM crew. Either message, if heard in the KLM cockpit, would have alerted the crew to the situation and given them time to abort the takeoff attempt.

Due to the fog, neither crew was able to see the other plane on the runway. In addition, neither of the aircraft could be seen from the control tower, as the airport was not equipped with ground radar.

After the KLM plane had started its takeoff roll, the tower instructed the Pan Am crew to "report the runway clear." The Pan Am crew replied, "OK, will report when we're clear." Upon hearing this, the KLM flight engineer expressed his concern about the Pan Am not being clear of the runway by asking the pilots in his own cockpit, saying "Is he not clear, that Pan American?" Veldhuyzen van Zanten emphatically replied, "Oh, yes", and continued with the takeoff.

=== Collision ===
According to the cockpit voice recorder (CVR), the Pan Am captain said, "There he is!" when he spotted the KLM's landing lights through the fog just as his plane approached exit C4. When it became clear that the KLM aircraft was approaching at takeoff speed, Captain Grubbs exclaimed, "Goddamn, that son of a bitch is coming!", while first officer Robert Bragg yelled, "Get off! Get off! Get off!" Grubbs applied full power to the throttles and made a sharp left turn toward the grass in an attempt to avoid the impending collision.

By the time the KLM pilots saw the Pan Am aircraft, they had already exceeded their V_{1} speed and were moving too fast to stop. In desperation, the pilots prematurely rotated the aircraft nose upward and attempted to clear the Pan Am by lifting off, causing a 22 m (72 ft) tailstrike. The KLM 747 was within 100 m (330 ft) of the Pan Am and moving at approximately 140 knots (260 km/h; 160 mph; 72 m/s) when it left the ground. The KLM 747's nose landing gear cleared the Pan Am, but its left-side engines, lower fuselage, and main landing gear struck the upper right side of the Pan Am's fuselage, ripping apart the middle of the Pan Am jet almost directly above the wing. The KLM 747's right-side engines crashed through the Pan Am's upper deck immediately aft of the cockpit, instantly killing all of the passengers seated there.

The KLM plane remained briefly airborne, but the impact had sheared off the No. 1 engine (outer left), caused significant amounts of shredded materials to be ingested by the No. 2 engine (inner left), and damaged the wings. The plane immediately went into a stall, rolled sharply, and hit the ground approximately 150 m (500 ft) past the collision, sliding down the runway for a further 300 m (1,000 ft). Upon impact with the runway, the full load of fuel ignited into a fireball that could not be subdued for several hours. One of the 61 survivors of the Pan Am flight said that sitting in the nose of the plane probably saved his life: "We all settled back, and the next thing an explosion took place and the whole port side, left side of the plane, was just torn wide open."

Veldhuyzen van Zanten was KLM's chief of flight training and one of their most senior pilots. About two months before the accident, he had conducted the Boeing 747 qualification check on the first officer of Flight 4805. His photograph was used for publicity materials such as magazine advertisements, including the inflight magazine on board PH-BUF. KLM had suggested initially that Veldhuyzen van Zanten should help with the investigation, unaware that he was the captain who had been killed in the accident.

== Victims ==
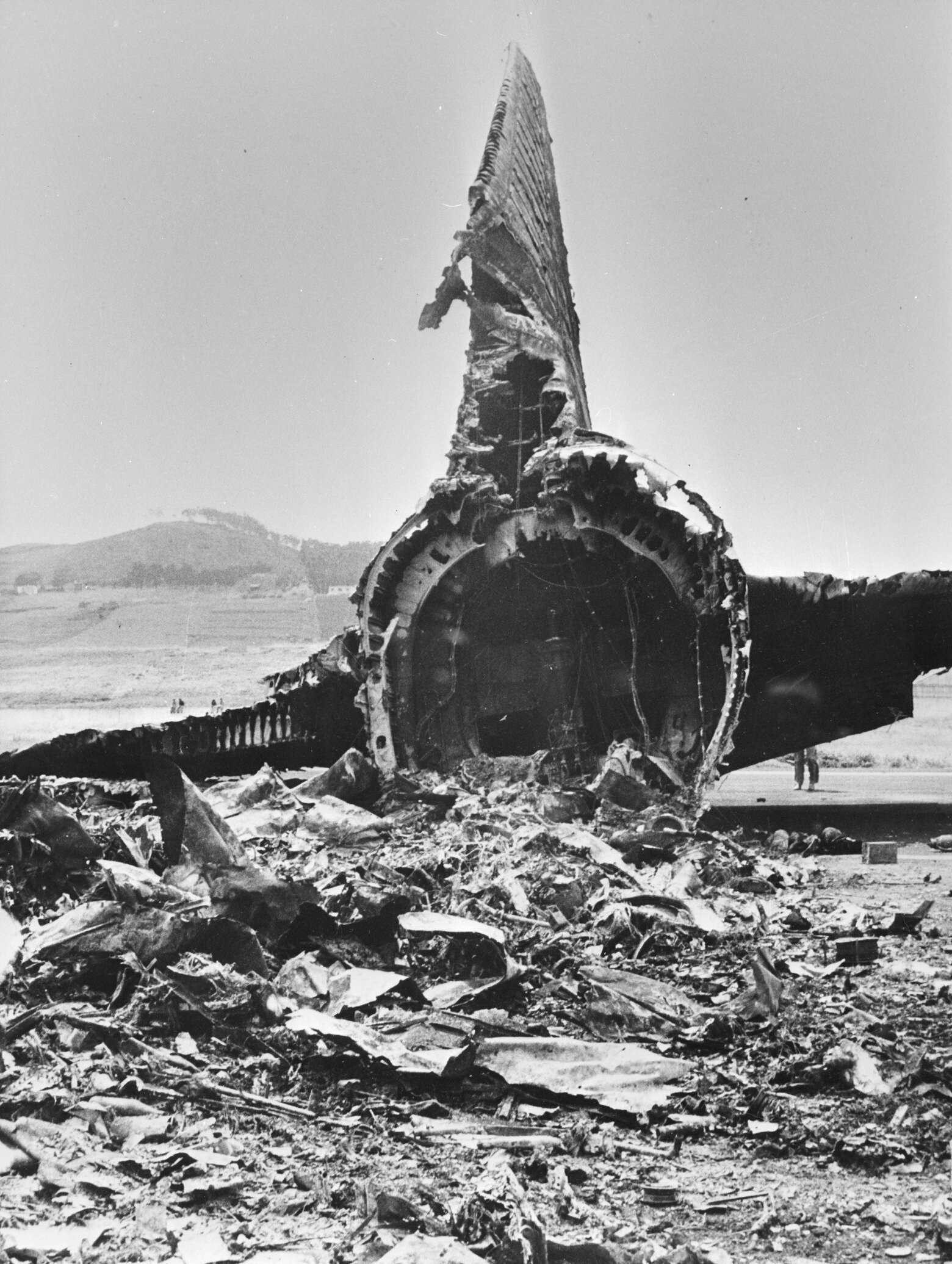
Remains of the KLM plane's vertical stabilizer

Both aircraft were destroyed in the collision. All 248 passengers and crew aboard the KLM plane were killed immediately, as were 317 of the 380 passengers and 9 of the 16 crew members aboard the Pan Am plane, primarily due to fire and explosions resulting from the fuel spilled and ignited in the impact. In the Pan Am aircraft, there were initially 70 survivors, but 9 passengers later died of their injuries. Among the survivors were all of the three pilots: Captain Grubbs, First Officer Bragg and Flight Engineer Warns, and four flight attendants. Most of the survivors on the Pan Am plane walked out onto the intact left wing, the side away from the collision, through holes in the fuselage structure.

The Pan Am's engines were still running for a few minutes after the accident despite Bragg's intention to turn them off. The roof of the cockpit, where the engine switches were located, had been destroyed in the collision, and all control lines were severed, leaving no means for the flight crew to control the aircraft's systems, including engine fire extinguishers. Survivors waited for rescue, but it did not come promptly, as the firefighters were initially unaware that there were two aircraft involved and were concentrating on the KLM wreck hundreds of meters away in the thick fog and smoke. Eventually, most of the survivors on the wing dropped to the ground below.

The Pan Am flight fatalities included at least 251 passengers and crew from California, 11 from Washington, 10 from Arizona, 9 from New York, 6 from Nevada, 5 from Oregon, 4 from Colorado and Utah, 3 from British Columbia and Hawaii, 2 from Alaska, Ohio, Illinois, and Washington, D.C., and 1 from Virginia, Pennsylvania, Minnesota, and Ontario.

=== Notable fatalities ===
- Eve Meyer, a pin-up model, film actress and producer and second wife of film director Russ Meyer, was on the Pan Am flight.
- A. P. Hamann, the former city manager of San Jose, California, was on the Pan Am flight.

== Aftermath ==
The following day, the Canary Islands Independence Movement, responsible for the bombing at Gran Canaria that started the chain of events that led to the disaster, denied responsibility for the accident.

Los Rodeos Airport was closed to all fixed-wing traffic for two days. The first crash investigators to arrive at Tenerife the day after the crash travelled there by way of a 3-hour boat ride from Las Palmas. The first aircraft that was able to land was a US Air Force C-130 transport, which landed on the airport's main taxiway at 12:50 on 29 March. The C-130 was arranged by Lt. Col Dr. James K. Slaton, who arrived before the crash investigators and started a triage of surviving passengers. Slaton was dispatched from Torrejon Air Base just outside of Madrid, Spain. Slaton, a flight surgeon attached to the 613th Tactical Fighter Squadron, worked with local medical staff and remained on scene until the last survivor was airlifted to awaiting medical facilities. The C-130 transported all surviving and injured passengers from Tenerife airport to Las Palmas; many of the injured were taken from there to other Air Force bases in the US for further treatment.

The Spanish Army cleared crash wreckage from the runways and taxiways. By 30 March, a small plane shuttle service was approved, but large jets still could not land. Los Rodeos was fully reopened on 3 April, after wreckage had been removed from the runway and engineers had repaired it.

== Investigation ==
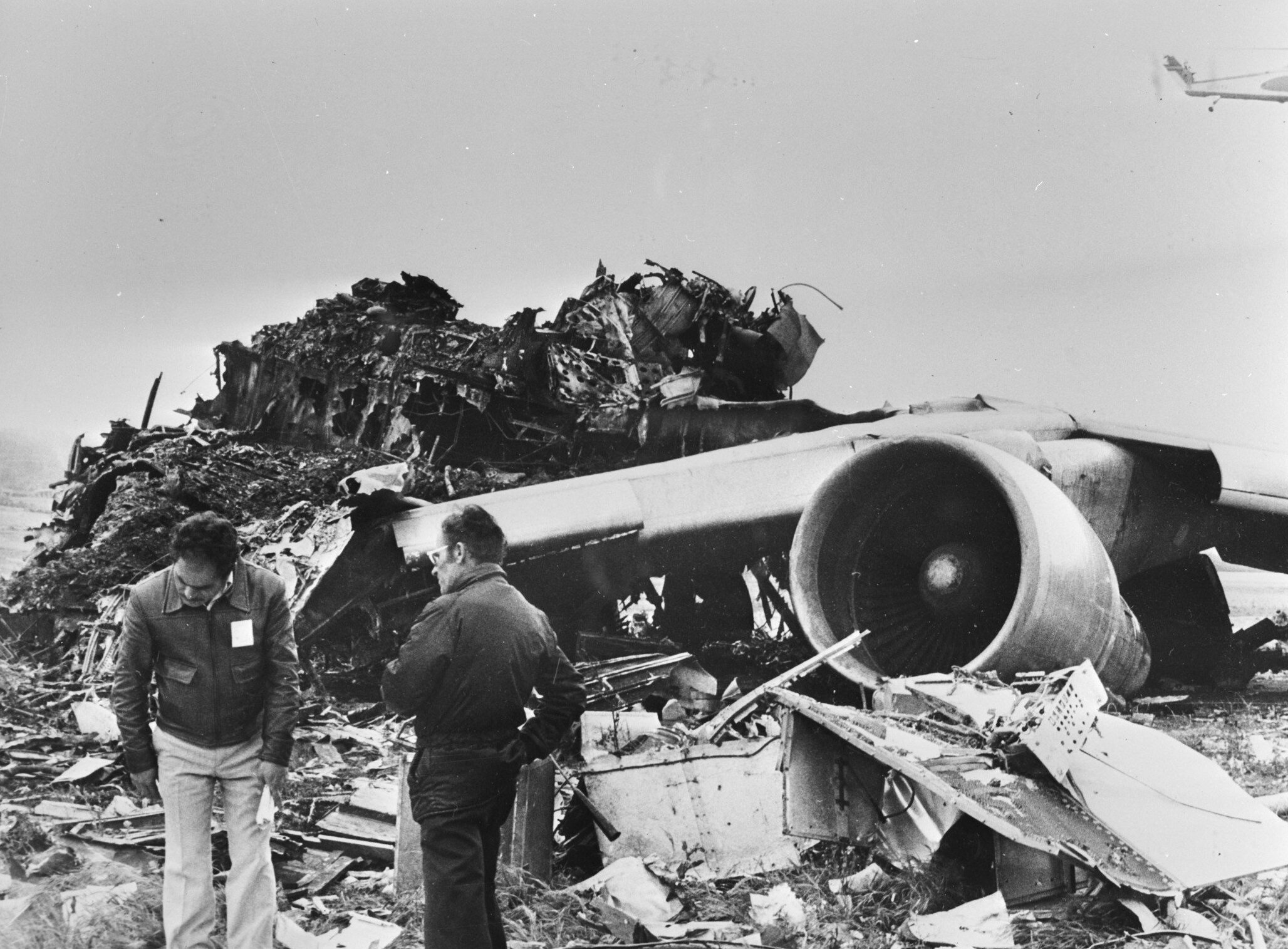
Wreckage of the Pan Am Boeing 747

Remains of the KLM Boeing 747, including the vertical stabiliser

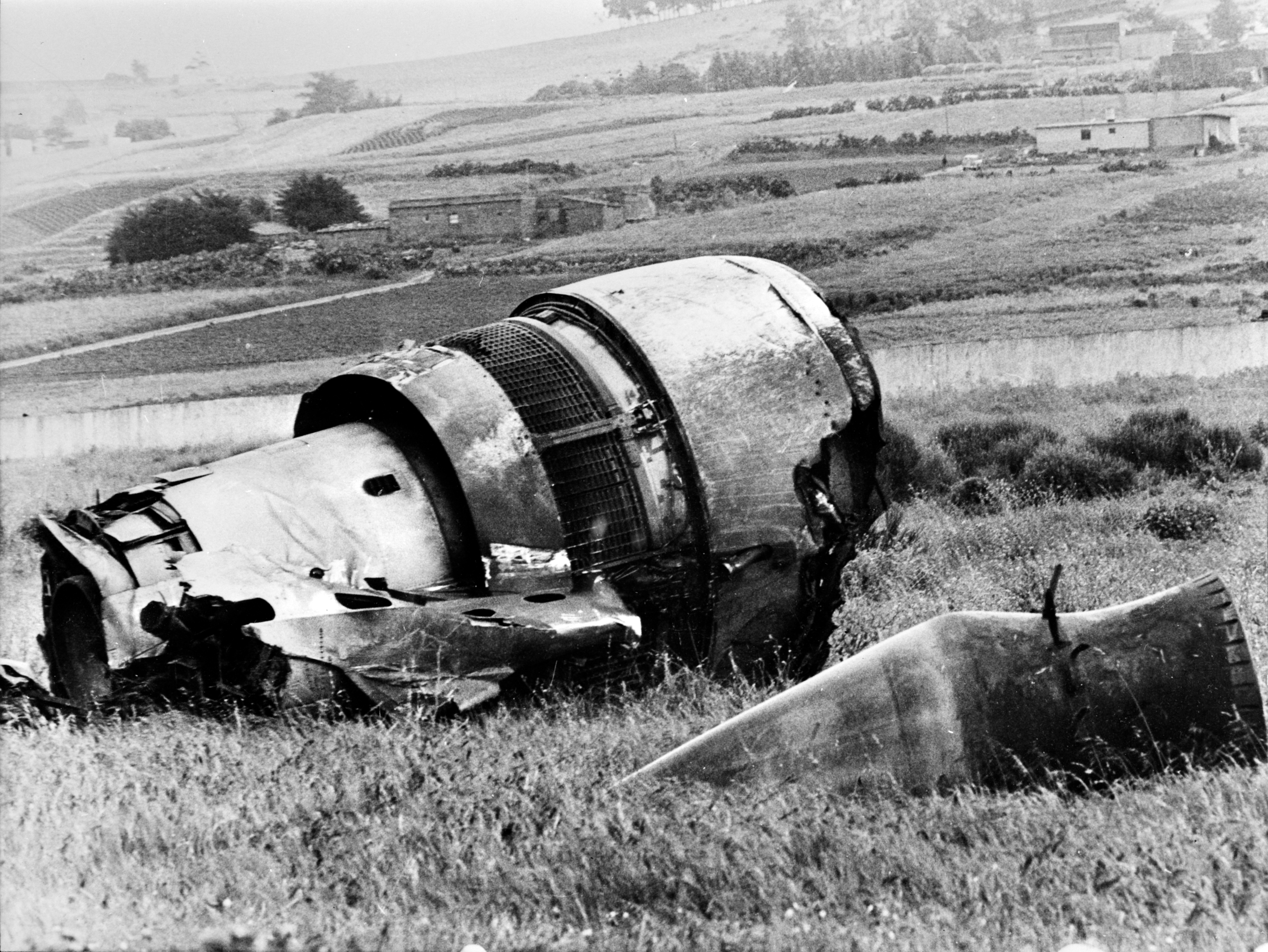
Wreckage of an engine of one of the jumbos. Both 747s were equipped with Pratt & Whitney JT9D engines.

The accident was investigated by Spain's Civil Aviation Accident and Incident Investigation Commission (CIAIAC). About 70 personnel were involved in the investigation, including representatives from the United States, the Netherlands and the two airline companies.

=== Probable cause ===
The investigation concluded that the fundamental cause of the accident was that Veldhuyzen van Zanten attempted to take off without clearance. The investigators suggested the reason for this was a desire to leave as soon as possible in order to comply with KLM's duty-time regulations (which were put in place earlier that year) and before the weather deteriorated further.

Other major factors contributing to the accident were:

- A heavy and sudden fog greatly limited visibility and the control tower and the crews of both planes were unable to see one another.
- Interference from simultaneous radio transmissions made hearing messages difficult.

The following factors were considered contributing but not critical:

- The use of ambiguous non-standard phrases by the KLM first officer ("We're at take off") and the Tenerife control tower ("OK").
- The Pan Am aircraft did not leave the runway at the third exit as instructed.
- The airport was forced to accommodate a great number of large aircraft rerouted by the terrorist incident, disrupting the normal use of taxiways.

=== Dutch response ===
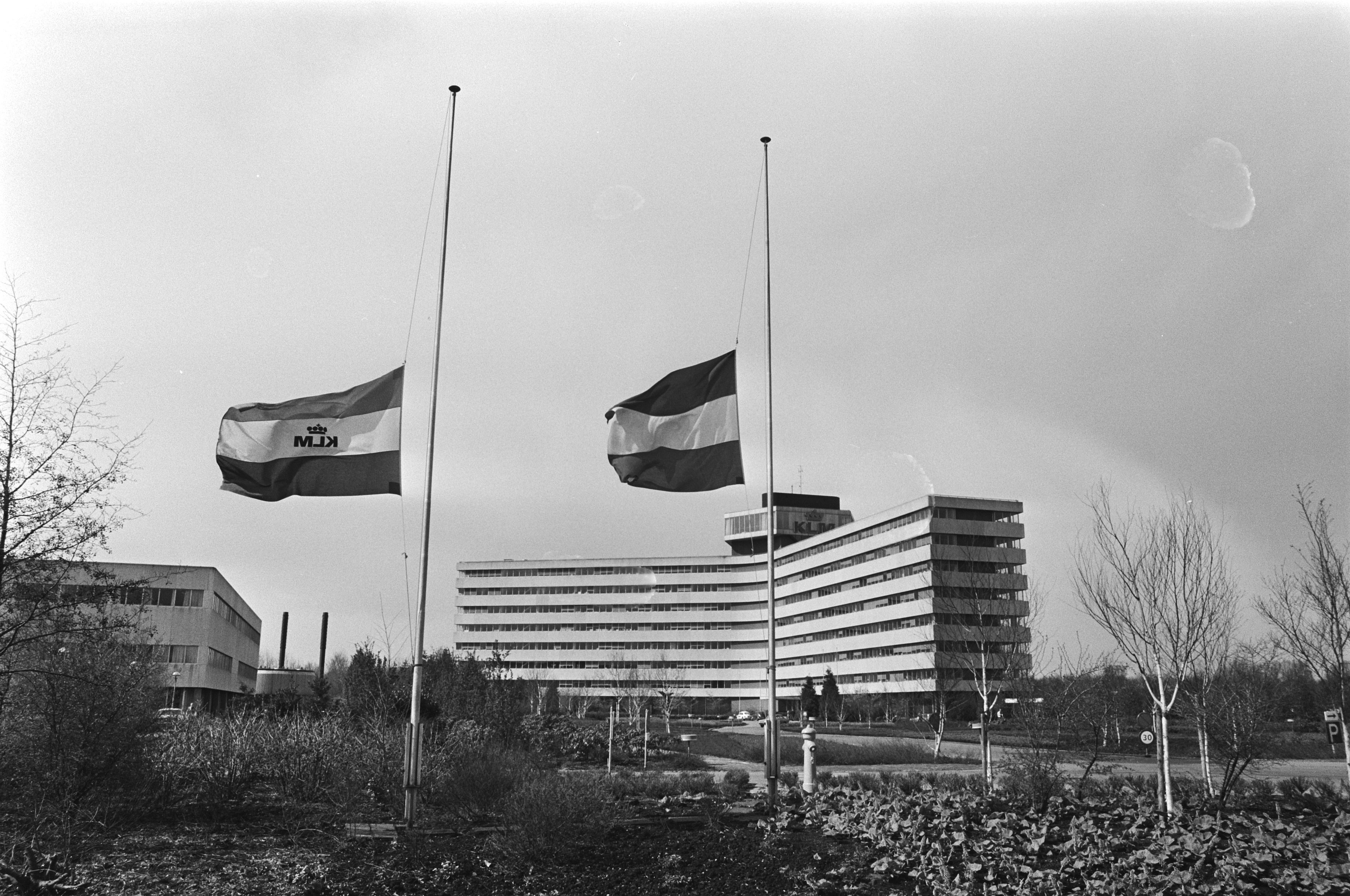
Flags at half-staff in KLM's headquarters in Amstelveen, following the disaster (1977)

The Dutch authorities were reluctant to accept the Spanish report blaming the KLM captain for the accident. The Netherlands Department of Civil Aviation published a response that, while accepting that the KLM captain had taken off "prematurely", argued that he alone should not be blamed for the "mutual misunderstanding" that occurred between the controller and the KLM crew, and that limitations of using radio as a means of communication should have been given greater consideration.

In their response, the Dutch authorities contended that:

- The crowded airport had placed additional pressure on all parties, including the KLM cockpit crew, the Pan Am cockpit crew, and the controller
- Sounds on the CVR suggested that during the accident the Spanish control tower crew had been listening to a football match on the radio and may have been distracted;
- The transmission from the tower in which the controller passed KLM their ATC clearance was ambiguous and could have been interpreted as also giving take-off clearance. In support of this part of their response, the Dutch investigators pointed out that Pan Am's messages "No! Eh?" and "We are still taxiing down the runway, the Clipper 1736!" indicated that Grubbs and Bragg had recognized the ambiguity (this message was not audible to the control tower or KLM crew due to simultaneous cross-communication)
- The Pan Am had taxied beyond the third exit. Had the plane turned at the third exit as instructed, the collision would not have occurred.

Although the Dutch authorities were initially reluctant to blame Veldhuyzen van Zanten and his crew, the airline ultimately accepted responsibility for the accident. KLM paid the victims' families compensation ranging between $58,000 and $600,000 (or $308,000 to $3.2 million today, adjusted for inflation). The sum of settlements for property and damages was $110 million (or $584 million today), an average of $189,000 (or $1,004,000 today) per victim, due to limitations imposed by European Compensation Conventions in effect at the time.

=== Speculations ===
This was one of the first accident investigations to include a study into the contribution of "human factors". These included:

- Veldhuyzen van Zanten, a KLM training captain and instructor for over ten years working on simulators regularly, had not flown on regular routes for twelve weeks prior to the accident.
- The KLM flight crew, including Veldhuyzen van Zanten, were concerned about exceeding their maximum legally allowable on-duty hours for the day, which Dutch law had recently tightened. This influenced Veldhuyzen van Zanten's decision to refuel at Tenerife for the flight to Amsterdam after as brief a stop as possible at Las Palmas.
- The apparent hesitation of the flight engineer and the first officer to challenge Veldhuyzen van Zanten further. The official investigation suggested that this might have been due to not only the captain's seniority in rank but also his being one of the most respected pilots working for the airline. The first officer had intervened when Veldhuyzen van Zanten first opened the throttles, but had then failed to do so on the second occasion. Even though the flight engineer had indeed asked the captain whether or not the Pan Am was clear of the runway, he seemed reassured by the captain's answer. The co-pilots had clearly challenged the captain's decisions, but were not insistent enough to convince him to abort the attempted takeoff.
- The flight engineer was the only member of the KLM's flight crew to react to the control tower's instruction to "report the runway clear"; this might have been due to his having completed his pre-flight checks, whereas his colleagues were experiencing an increased workload, just as the visibility worsened.
- The ALPA study group concluded that the KLM crew did not realize that the transmission "Papa Alpha One Seven Three Six, report the runway clear" was directed at the Pan Am, because this was the first and only time the Pan Am was referred to by that name. Previously, the Pan Am had been called "Clipper One Seven Three Six", using its proper call-sign.

The extra fuel taken on by the KLM added several factors:

- Takeoff was delayed by an extra 35 minutes, allowing time for the fog to settle in;
- The fuel added more than 45 tons of additional weight to the aircraft, increasing the takeoff distance and making it more difficult to clear the Pan Am when taking off;
- It increased the size of the fire from the crash that ultimately killed everyone on board the KLM plane and most of those on the Pan Am jet.

== Legacy ==
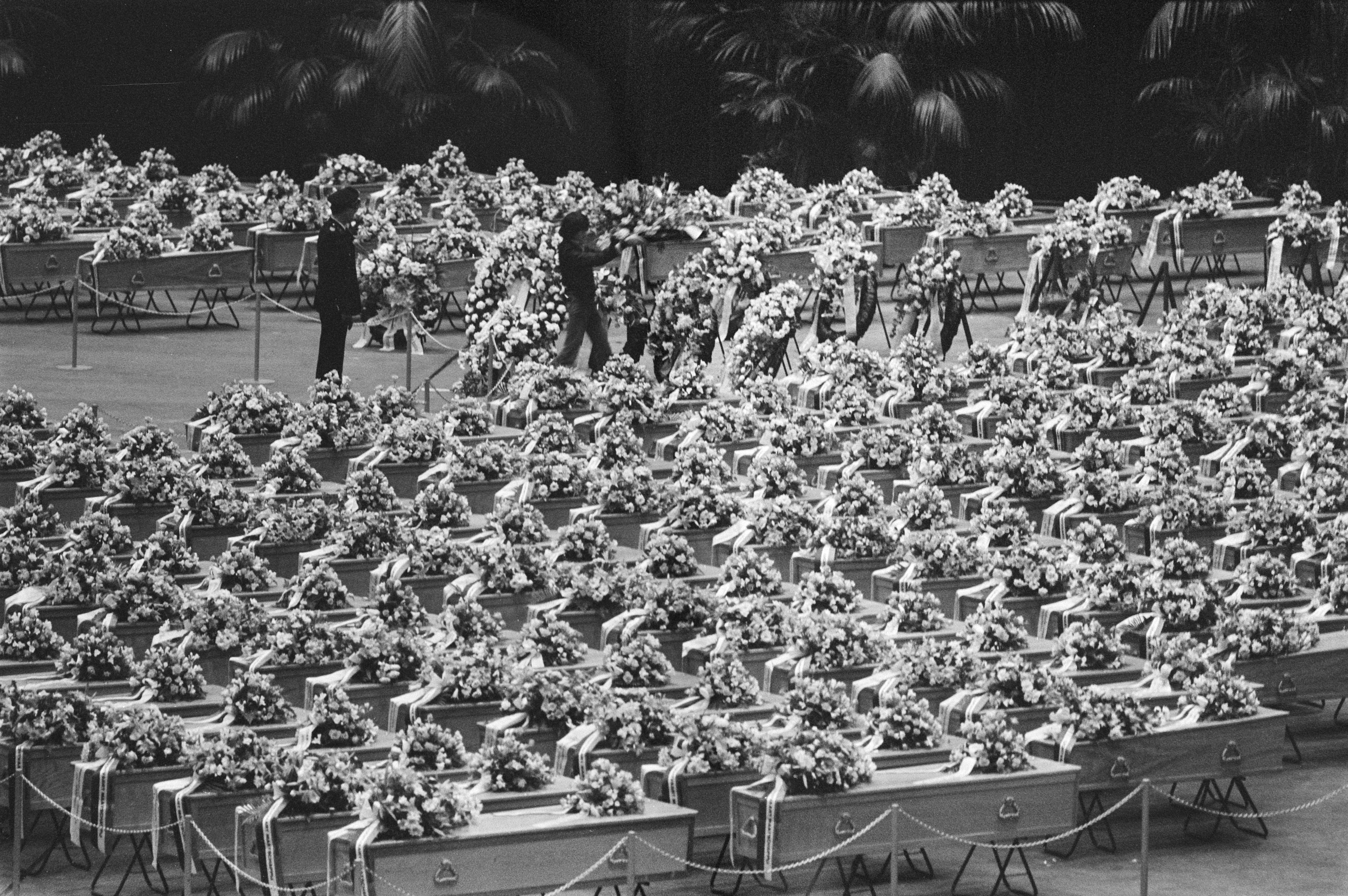
Funeral service for the victims of the Tenerife airport disaster at Amsterdam Airport Schiphol (6 April 1977)

As a consequence of the accident, sweeping changes were made to international airline regulations and to aircraft. Aviation authorities around the world introduced requirements for standard phrases and a greater emphasis on English as a common working language.

Air traffic instruction must not be acknowledged solely with a colloquial phrase such as "OK" or even "Roger" (which simply means the last transmission was received), but with a readback of the key parts of the instruction, to show mutual understanding. The word "takeoff" is now spoken only when the actual takeoff clearance is given, or when cancelling that same clearance (i.e. "cleared for takeoff" or "cancel takeoff clearance"). Until that point, aircrew and controllers should use the word "departure" in its place (e.g. "ready for departure"). Additionally, an ATC clearance given to an aircraft already lined up on the runway must be prefixed with the instruction "hold position".

Cockpit procedures were also changed after the accident. Hierarchical relations among crew members were played down, and greater emphasis was placed on team decision-making by mutual agreement. Less experienced flight crew members were encouraged to challenge their captains when they believed something to be incorrect, and captains were instructed to listen to their crew and evaluate all decisions in light of crew concerns. This course of action was later expanded into what is known today as crew resource management (CRM), which states that all pilots, no matter how experienced they are, are allowed to contradict each other. CRM training has been mandatory for all airline pilots since 2006.

In 1978, a second airport was opened on the island of Tenerife, the new Tenerife South Airport (TFS), which now serves the majority of international tourist flights. Los Rodeos, renamed Tenerife North Airport (TFN), was then used only for domestic and inter-island flights until 2002, when a new terminal was opened and Tenerife North began to carry international traffic again.

The Spanish government installed a ground radar system at Tenerife North Airport following the accident.

== Memorials ==
Tenerife disaster memorials

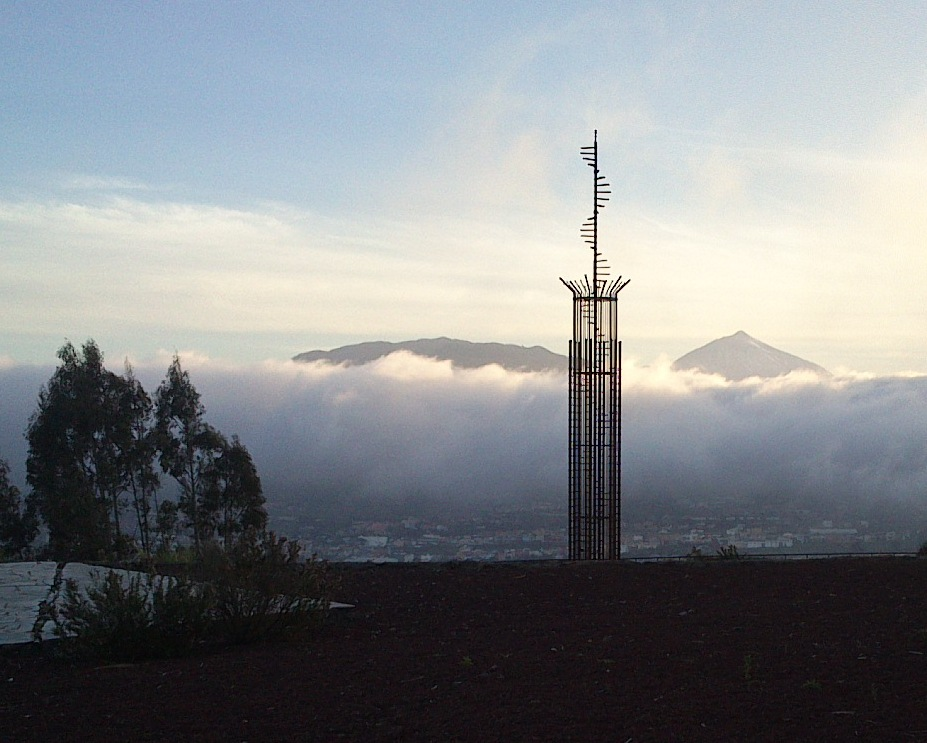
Memorial on Tenerife

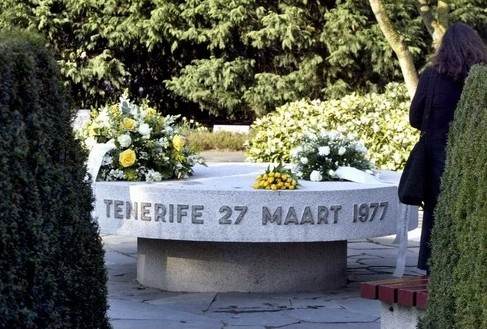
Westgaarde Cemetery

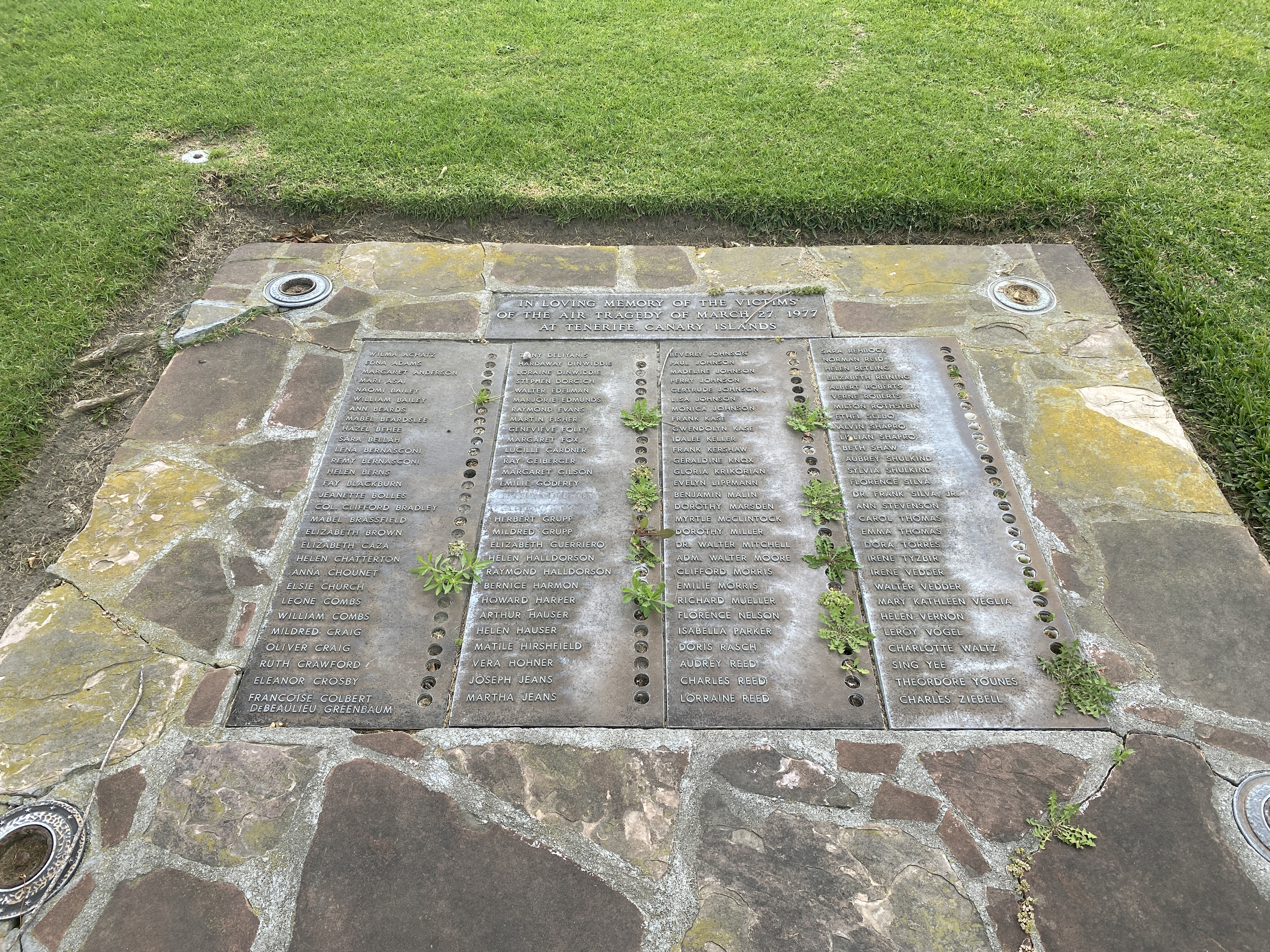
Westminster Memorial Park

A Dutch national memorial and final resting place for the victims of the KLM plane is located in Amsterdam, at Westgaarde cemetery. There is also a memorial at the Westminster Memorial Park and Mortuary in Westminster, California, US.

In 1977, a cross in Rancho Bernardo, San Diego, California was dedicated to 19 area residents who died in the disaster.

In 2007, the 30th anniversary marked the first time that Dutch and American next-of-kin and aid helpers from Tenerife joined an international commemoration service, held at the Auditorio de Tenerife in Santa Cruz. The International Tenerife Memorial 27 March 1977 was inaugurated at the Mesa Mota on 27 March 2007. The monument was designed by Dutch sculptor Rudi van de Wint (1942–2006).

== Documentaries ==
The disaster has been featured in many TV shows, podcasts and documentaries. These include:

- Episode 1 of Survival in the Sky, "Blaming the Pilot" (1996).
- Episode 12 of Seconds From Disaster, "Collision on the Runway" (2004).
- Episode 625 of PBS's NOVA, "The Deadliest Plane Crash" (2006).
- The PBS special Surviving Disaster: How the Brain Works Under Extreme Duress (2011), which was based on Amanda Ripley's book The Unthinkable: Who Survives When Disaster Strikes - and Why.
- An episode of Destroyed in Seconds.
- Episode 133 (S16E03) of the Canadian TV series Mayday (known by different names in different countries), "Disaster at Tenerife" (2016), as well as the earlier in-depth 90-minute special "Crash of the Century" (2005).
- Footage of the wreckage appears in the disaster documentary Days of Fury (1979), directed by Fred Warshofsky.
- Episode 5 of the Nebula series Under Exposure (2023) by Neo.
- Series 5 episodes 1 and 2 of the Cautionary Tales podcast (2025) by Pushkin Industries, hosted by Tim Harford.

== See also ==
- 1983 Madrid Airport runway collision
- 1990 Wayne County Airport runway collision
- 2001 Linate Airport runway collision
- 1991 Los Angeles runway collision
