= Business English =

Part of English for specific purposes

Business English is a part of English for specific purposes and can be considered a specialism within English language learning and teaching or a variant of international English. Many non-native English speakers study the subject with the goal of doing business with English-speaking countries or with companies located outside the English-speaking world but which nonetheless use English as a shared language or lingua franca. Much of the English communication that takes place within business circles all over the world occurs between non-native speakers. In cases such as these, the object of the exercise is efficient and effective communication. The strict rules of grammar are sometimes ignored in such cases when, for example, a stressed negotiator's only goal is to reach an agreement as quickly as possible. (See linguist Braj Kachru's theory of the "expanding circle".)

Business English means different things to different people and is used differently in different organization according their own needs and services. For some, it focuses on vocabulary and topics used in the worlds of business, trade, finance, and international relations. For others, it refers to the communication skills used in the workplace and focuses on the language and skills needed for typical business communication such as presentations, negotiations, meetings, small talk, socializing, correspondence, report writing, and a systematic approach. In both of these cases, it can be taught to native speakers of English, for example, high school students preparing to enter the job market. One can also study it at a college or university. Institutes around the world have courses or modules in BE available, which can lead to a degree in the subject.

== See also ==
- International Association of Teachers of English as a Foreign Language
