= List of language proficiency tests =

The following is a non-exhaustive list of standardized tests that assess a person's language proficiency of a foreign/secondary language. Various types of such exams exist per many languages—some are organized at an international level even through national authoritative organizations, while others simply for specific limited business or study orientation.

== Multilingual ==
- American Council on the Teaching of Foreign Languages (ACTFL) tests are offered to assess language proficiency in many languages. (Note: Afrikaans, Akan-Twi, Albanian, Amharic, Arabic, Armenian, Azerbaijani, Balochi, Bengali, Bosnian, Bulgarian, Cambodian, Cebuano, Cantonese, Croatian, Czech, Danish, Dari, Dutch, English, Finnish, French, Ga, Georgian, German, Greek, Gujarati, Haitian Creole, Hausa, Hebrew, Hiligaynon, Hindi, Hmong-Mong, Hungarian, Igbo, Ilocano, Indonesian, Italian, Javanese, Kazakh, Kikongo-Kongo, Korean, Krio, Kurdish, Laotian, Latin, Malay, Malayalam, Mandarin, Mongolian, Nepali, Norwegian, Persian, Polish, Portuguese, Romanian, Sinhalese, Slovak, Slovak, Somali, Spanish, Swahili (Kiswahili), Swedish, Tagalog, Tajik, Tamil, Telugu, Thai, Tigrinya, Turkish, Turkmen, Uyghur, Urdu, Uzbek, Wolof, Yoruba, Zulu)
- The Foreign Language Achievement Testing Service (FLATS) at Brigham Young University offer both BYU and non-BYU students language proficiency tests. (Note: Albanian, Arabic, Armenian, Bulgarian, Cambodian, Cantonese, Cebuano, Croatian, Czech, Danish, Dutch, Estonian, Farsi, Fijian, Finnish, French, Georgian, German, Modern Greek, Haitian Creole, Hmong, Hungarian, Icelandic, Ilonggo-Hiligaynon, Indonesian, Italian, Japanese, Korean, Latvian, Lithuanian, Malagasy, Malay, Mandarin Chinese, Mongolian, Norwegian, Polish, Brazilian Portuguese, European Portuguese, Romanian, Russian, Samoan, Serbian, Spanish, Swedish, Tagalog, Tahitian, Thai, Tongan, Ukrainian, Vietnamese)
- Certificados en Lenguas Extranjeras (CLE). Certificate of proficiency in six languages: English, Mandarin Chinese, French, German, Italian, and Portuguese. The certificates are issued by the Ministry of Education of Buenos Aires, Argentina. The test targets primary and secondary-level students in Buenos Aires, for whom it is free of charge.

== Albanian ==
- University of Tirana offers its own levels from A1-C2. Exams are held on the last Friday of every month, except July, August and December.

== American Sign Language ==
- ASLPI American Sign Language Proficiency Interview
- SLPI Sign Language Proficiency Interview

== Arabic ==
- Hamza test is a standardized Arabic language proficiency test for non-native speakers, developed by the King Salman Global Academy for Arabic Language. Launched on 12 December 2023 at the academy's international conference, titled for that year "Linguistic Testing: Theories, Experiences, and Prospects", the test aligns with CEFR levels A2 to C1, evaluating four core skills: reading, listening, writing, and speaking for academic and professional purposes.
- The Arabic Language Proficiency Test (ALPT) is a standardized Arabic proficiency test designed by Arabic Academy and endorsed by the Islamic Chamber of Commerce and Industry (ICCI). It was started in 2002 and has five sections: listening, reading, structure, writing, speaking.
- Berlitz Language Institutes offer a competency test in reading, writing, speaking and listening assessing proficiency in Arabic according to the CEFR benchmark.
- Eton Institute in Dubai offers its own "Arabic Language Competency Test" (ALCT), a 4-skills (reading, writing, speaking, listening) exam which generates a band-score result for Arabic similar to the IELTS model.
- The AL-ARABIYYA-TEST by the Al Arabiyya Institute, is an Arabic language proficiency test conducted online that measures a learner's level according to the CEFR benchmark.
- CIMA (Certificat international de maîtrise en arabe) is a standardized Arabic proficiency test developed by the Institut du monde arabe in Paris, France, and is offered since 2018 at the institute and in several accredited centres around the world.
- ILA - Certificazione Lingua Araba is an Arabic proficiency test of the 'Centro Studi' of Milan (Italy).

== Brazilian Sign Language ==
- ProLibras - Brazilian Sign Language Certificate
- ProLibras - Certificação em língua brasileira de sinais (libras)

== British Sign Language ==
- Signature - British Sign Language Certificate Levels 1-6
- iBSL - British Sign Language Certificate Levels 1-6
- Scottish Qualifications Authority - British Sign Language Certificate Levels 1–6, along with other related qualifications.

== Bulgarian ==
- The Standard Test of Bulgarian as a Foreign Language (STBFL, Стандартизиран тест по български език като чужд език, СТБЕЧ)
- ECL - European Consortium for the Certificate of Attainment in Modern Languages

== Catalan ==
- Certificats de català - Institut Ramon Llull. Valid in most Catalan-speaking territories, usually the first option in Catalonia: Nivell bàsic (A2), elemental (B1), intermedi (B2), de suficiència (C1), superior (C2).
- Certificats de valencià - Junta Qualificadora de Coneixements de Valencià. Valid in most Catalan-speaking territories, usually the first option in Valencia: Nivell A2, Nivell B1, Grau mitjà (C1), Grau superior (C2).
- Certificats de català - Direcció General de Política Lingüística del Govern Balear. Valid in most Catalan-speaking territories, usually the first option in the Balearic Islands: Nivell A2, B1, B2, C1, C2.

== Chinese ==
=== Mandarin ===
- HSK - Hanyu Shuiping Kaoshi (汉语水平考试). Official test of Mandarin in mainland China, consisting of reading, writing, listening and comprehension
- HSKK - HSK Speaking Test (汉语水平口语考试). HSKK assesses the test takers’ oral Chinese abilities. HSKK is divided into three levels: primary, intermediate and advanced. The test is conducted in the form of audio recording.
- TOCFL - Test of Chinese as a Foreign Language. Test used in Taiwan for Mandarin as a foreign language.
- TSC - Test of Spoken Chinese was conducted under the leadership of YBM, the largest language institute in Korea. Most large South Korean companies now require Chinese employees to pass the TSC.
- BCT - Business Chinese Test (商务汉语考试), as an international, standardized test of Chinese language proficiency, focuses on assessing non-native Chinese speakers’ abilities to use the Chinese language in real business or common working environments and evaluating the language tasks they are able to complete. The BCT, as a test series, consists of three independent tests: BCT (A), BCT (B) and the BCT Speaking Test.
- YCT - Youth Chinese Test (中小学生中文考试). International standardised Chinese language, for primary and secondary school students.

=== Cantonese ===
- Certificate in Chinese Language - University of Hong Kong
  - First Examination
  - Certificate Examination
- Computerized Oral Proficiency Assessment (COPA) by the Chinese University of Hong Kong - assessment of oral and comprehension skills only
- Diploma Programme in Chinese as a Foreign/Second Language (Cantonese) - Chinese University of Hong Kong; levels: Foundation, Certificate, Diploma, Advanced

=== Hokkien ===
- MSC - Minnanhua Shuiping Ceshi (simplified Chinese: 闽南话水平测试; traditional Chinese: 閩南話水平測試; Pe̍h-ōe-jī: Bân-lâm-ōe Chúi-pêng Chhek-chhì; lit. 'Hokkien Level Test'). Offered in mainland China. It is a speaking test with four parts: reading out words, sentences, a passage and speaking on a topic. There is no preferred dialect of Hokkien for the test; any dialect may be used as long as the pronunciation is proper in that dialect. The first test was held in Xiamen on 19 November 2016 to select future examiners, and so it was only for people in the education, broadcasting and cultural sectors who have received prior trainings. The first test open to the public was held on 9 and 10 December 2017 in Xiamen and a free 2-day pre-test training was provided to test-takers.
- General Taiwanese Proficiency Test (GTPT) is a standardized proficiency test for speakers of Taiwanese Hokkien designed by the Center for Taiwanese Languages Testing at National Cheng Kung University, Tainan, Taiwan. In addition to GTPT, there is another International Taiwanese Proficiency Test (ITPT) for speakers of Taiwanese Hokkien as a second language.

=== Hakka ===
- Since 2005, the Hakka Affairs Council of Taiwan has conducted the Hakka Proficiency Certification (客語能力認證). The test is divided into 6 levels and participants take a written and speaking exam. The speaking exam is conducted in the 5 main Taiwanese Hakka dialects to cater to each dialect's distinct intonations and vocabularies.

== Croatian ==
- TPHJ - Testiranje poznavanja hrvatskog jezika
- ECL - European Consortium for the Certificate of Attainment in Modern Languages

== Czech ==
- CCE - Czech Language Certificate Exam
- ECL - European Consortium for the Certificate of Attainment in Modern Languages

== Danish ==
- CLAVIS Danish Language Proficiency Test

== Dutch ==
- Staatsexamen Nederlands als tweede taal (State Exams Dutch as a Second Language, abbreviated NT2). A two-part examination required in the Netherlands to study at the tertiary level. Part I is less thorough than II. Successful completion gains a NT2-I or NT2-II diploma
- Certificaat Nederlands als vreemde taal (CNavT). A set of six exams, each aimed at confirming proficiency for specific fields. "Profile Tourist and Informal Language Proficiency (PTIT)" is equal to ECF A2, and "Profile Language Proficiency Higher Education" is equal to ECF B2 (both are accepted by most higher-level education institutions in Belgium and the Netherlands).

== English ==
- AMIR - English Proficiency Test for Higher Education in Israel
- Babbel English Test, a test "powered by Cambridge English"
- CAL BEST Literacy
- CAL BEST Plus 2.0
- CAL English Proficiency Test
  - for Teachers (CAL EPT Teachers)
  - for Students (CAL EPT Students)
  - Diagnostic for Students (CAL EPT Diagnostic)
- Cambridge English Language Assessment
  - A2 Key
  - B1 Preliminary
  - B2 First
  - C1 Advanced
  - C2 Proficiency
- Cambridge Young Learners English Tests
- CaMLA ECCE (The Examination for the Certificate of Competency in English)
- CaMLA ECPE (The Examination for the Certificate of Proficiency in English)
- CaMLA EPT (CaMLA English Placement Test)
- CaMLA ITASA (International Teaching Assistant Speaking Assessment)
- CaMLA MELAB (The Michigan English Language Assessment Battery)
- CaMLA MET (The Michigan English Test)
- Canadian English Language Proficiency Index Program (CELPIP) – an English language proficiency test designated by Immigration, Refugees and Citizenship Canada (IRCC) for permanent resident status in Canada and Canadian citizenship.
- Canadian Academic English Language Assessment (CAEL)
- Duolingo English Test (DET) by Duolingo
- E3PT - English3 Proficiency Test
- E3J1 English Interview
- ECL - European Consortium for the Certificate of Attainment in Modern Languages
- EF Standard English Test
- ELSA English Language Skills Assessment
- Former ELPT - English Language Proficiency Test
- STEP Eiken - Eiken Foundation of Japan
- General English Proficiency Test in Taiwan
- General Tests of English Language Proficiency (G-TELP)
- IELPT - International English Language Proficiency Test
- IELTS - International English Language Testing System
- IELCA - International English Language Competency Assessment
- iTEP - International Test of English Proficiency
- MHLE - Iran Ministry of Health Language Exam
- MSRT - Iran Ministry of Science, Research and Technology language exam (Also known as MCHE)
- Malaysian University English Test (MUET)
- Occupational English Test (OET) is specifically designed for healthcare professionals
- Oxford Test of English (OTE) - Four skill online computer-adaptive test for adults, CEFR A2, B1, and B2
- Oxford Test of English for Schools (OTEfS) - Four skill online computer-adaptive test for test takers 12 – 16 years, CEFR A2, B1, and B2
- Oxford Test of English Advanced (OTE Advanced) - Four skill online computer-adaptive academic English test with a focus on mediation skills, CEFR B2 and C1
- Path International Examinations
- Password Test, used by Lingnan University
- PTE Academic - Online testing
- PTE General - A series of six exams from Pearson Language Assessments (formerly known as the London Tests of English)
- STEP EIKEN - Test in Practical English Proficiency (Japan)
- CET-4 and CET-6 - College English Test band 4 and band 6 (China)
- TEM-4 and TEM-8 - Test for English Majors band 4 and band 8 (China)
- PETS - Public English Test System (China)
- Test of English as a Functional Language (IIT Kanpur, India)
- TEPS - Test of English Proficiency (South Korea)
- TELC - The European Language Certificates
- TIEC - Test of International English Competency
- TOEFL - Test of English as a Foreign Language
- TOEIC - Test of English for International Communication
- TOLIMO - The Test of Language by the Iranian Measurement Organization
- TrackTest English Proficiency Test - Online English Assessment Center using six CEFR levels.
- TSE - Test of Spoken English
- Trinity College London ESOL
- TWE - Test of Written English
- UBELT - University of Bath English Language Test

== Esperanto ==
- CEFR certification for levels B1, B2, C1

== Estonian ==
- Estonian Language Proficiency Examinations (Eesti keele tasemeeksamid)

== Finnish ==
- YKI exam offered by University of Jyväskylä
- Various, Yleiset kielitutkinnot from Opetushallitus

== French ==
- TEF - Test d'évaluation du français
- TCF - Test de connaissance du français
- TFI - Test de français international
- Diplôme d'études en langue française (DELF) - Levels: A1, A2, B1, B2.
- Diplôme approfondi de langue française (DALF) - Levels: C1, C2.
- Examens de langue française (Université Paris-Sorbonne IV) - Levels: B1, B2, C1, C2, C3
- ECL - European Consortium for the Certificate of Attainment in Modern Languages
- TELC - The European Language Certificates

== French Sign Language ==
- Le Diplôme de Compétence en Langue des Signes Française (DCL) (The French Sign Language Proficiency Diploma) is a national diploma that was created specifically for adults.

== Galician ==
- CELGA - Certificado en lingua galega - Xunta de Galicia: CELGA 1 (A2), 2 (B1), 3 (B2), 4 (C1), 5 (C2)

== German ==
- Deutsches Sprachdiplom Stufe I and II (DSD) - German as a foreign language
- DSH - Deutsche Sprachprüfung für den Hochschulzugang
- TestDaF - Test Deutsch als Fremdsprache
- ZD - Zertifikat Deutsch
- ZDfB - Zertifikat Deutsch für den Beruf
- Österreichisches Sprachdiplom Deutsch (OSD) - Austrian German Diploma
- ECL - European Consortium for the Certificate of Attainment in Modern Languages
- A1/A2 level (Start Deutsch 1/2) from the Goethe-Institut
- B1/B2/C1 level (Goethe-Zertifikat B1/B2/C1) from the Goethe-Institut
- C2 level (Großes Deutsches Sprachdiplom) from the Goethe-Institut
- TELC - The European Language Certificates

== Greek ==
- Βεβαίωση Ελληνομάθειας - The B2 Certificate in Greek Language, administered by the Modern Greek Language Teaching Center (University of Athens).
- Πιστοποίηση Ελληνομάθειας - Certification of Attainment in Greek, administered by the Center for the Greek Language, in accordance with CEFR levels A1, A2, B1, B2, Γ1, Γ2.

== Hebrew ==
- The Hebrew Proficiency Test (YAEL) takes place in Israel and is taken by students who seek to demonstrate a sufficient knowledge of Hebrew for the sake of university admissions.
- ECL - European Consortium for the Certificate of Attainment in Modern Languages.

== Hindi ==
- Kendriya Hindi Sansthan

== Hungarian ==
- ECL - European Consortium for the Certificate of Attainment in Modern Languages. The certificate examinations are staged on four levels of language proficiency according to the Common European Framework of Reference for Languages: A2 beginner, B1 basic, B2 intermediate, C1 advanced.
- ELTE Hungarian Language Courses from complete beginner (A1) to proficiency levels (C2)
- ORIGO Egynyelvű vizsga (Hungarian-only exam) by Idegennyelvi Továbbkepző Központ levels B1, B2 and C1 recognized by the Hungarian State

== Indonesian ==
- UKBI (Uji Kemahiran Berbahasa Indonesia) also called TOIFL (Test of Indonesian as a Foreign Language)

== Irish ==
- Teastas Eorpach na Gaeilge TEG Levels A1, A2, B1, B2, C1

== Italian ==
According to the Ministero degli Esteri (Italian Foreign Affairs), there are four officials Italian certifications approved CLIQ (Certificato di Lingua Italiana di Qualità): CILS, CELI, PLIDA and .IT ROMA TRE

- CILS (Qualification) - Certificazione di Italiano come Lingua Straniera
- CELI - Certificato di Conoscenza della Lingua Italiana
- PLIDA - Certificazione Progetto Lingua Italiana Dante Alighieri
- CERT.IT - Certificazione dell'Italiano come lingua straniera
- CPIA, Centri Provinciali per l'Istruzione degli Adulti, issue A1-A2 certifications valid for the extended residence permit application
- TELC - The European Language Certificates
- AIL (Qualification) - Accademia Italiana di Lingua, Diploma Elementare di Lingua Italiana DELI A1 A2, Diploma Intermedio di Lingua Italiana DILI B1 B2, Diploma Avanzato di Lingua Italiana DALI C1, C2, Diploma Commerciale di Lingua Italiana DILC B1 DALC C1

== Japanese ==
- JLPT - Japanese Language Proficiency Test (N5, N4, N3, N2, N1)
- NAT-TEST - The Japanese Language NAT-TEST (N5, N4, N3, N2, N1)
- BJT - Business Japanese Proficiency Test (ビジネス日本語能力テスト)
- EJU - Examination for Japanese University Admission (日本留学試験)
- Nihongo Kentei - Overall Japanese language proficiency test (日本語検定)
- Japan Proverb Test (ことわざクイズ) offered by Japan Proverb Test Association
- J-Test

== Japanese Sign Language ==
- Zenkoku-Shuwa Kentei

== Kazakh ==
- KAZTEST, developed by the National Testing Center of the Ministry of Education and Science of Kazakhstan.

== Klingon ==
- Klingon Language Institute (Klingon Language Certification Program)

== Korean ==
- KPE- Korean proficiency Exam
- TOPIK - Test of Proficiency in Korean
- KLAT - Korean Language Ability Test (formerly Korean Language Proficiency Test, or KLPT)

== Kurmanji ==
- Kurmanji Proficiency Testing Project offered by Indiana University Bloomington

== Kyrgyz ==
- КЫРГЫЗТЕСТ (Kyrgyztest)

== Latin ==
- AP Latin
- Certamen Ciceronianum Arpinas
- National Latin Exam

== Latvian ==
- State Language Proficiency Certificate in Latvian

== Lithuanian ==
- Level Examinations of Language Proficiency for Lithuanian

== Luxembourgish ==
- LaF - Diplom Lëtzebuergesch als Friemsprooch

== Malay ==
- The Malay Language Proficiency Certification Test, or Sijil Kecekapan Bahasa Melayu Bagi Warganegara Asing (SKBMW), endorsed by the Malaysian Ministry of Higher Education, and governed by Malaysian Examinations Council (Majlis Peperiksaan Malaysia);
- The Malay Language Entrance Proficiency Test (ML EPT), only applicable for applicants being considered for teaching Malay in Singapore.

== Mongolian ==
- Mongolian Language Proficiency Test (MLPT)

== Myanmar (Burmese) ==
- Myanmar Language Test (MLT): Test levels include MB, M1, M2, M3, M4.

== Norwegian ==
- Norsk Språktest - Folkeuniversitetet:

- Norskprøve 2 for voksne innvandrere - Level A2;
- Norskprøve 3 for voksne innvandrere - Level B1;
- Test i norsk - høyere nivå - Advanced Level (Bergenstesten).

- Bergenstest for voksne innvandrere - Level B2

== Pashto ==
- Pashto Proficiency Testing Project offered by Indiana University Bloomington

== Persian ==
- SAMFA Standard Persian Language Proficiency Test
- Ankara University TÖMER Persian course offering levels A1 to C1
- Georgetown University offers proficiency testing in this language for its own students.

== Polish ==
- Certificate Examinations in Polish as a Foreign Language. The certificate examinations are staged on three levels of language proficiency:

- B1 – basic;
- B2 – general intermediate;
- C2 – advanced.

- ECL - European Consortium for the Certificate of Attainment in Modern Languages

== Portuguese ==
=== Brazilian Portuguese ===
- CELPE-Bras - Brazilian Certificate of Proficiency in Portuguese for Foreigners

=== European Portuguese ===
- TELC - The European Language Certificates (Portuguese Level B1 only)
- CAPLE - Centre for Evaluation of the Portuguese Language (Centro de Avaliação de Português Língua Estrangeira)

- ACESSO - Certificado acesso ao português (Level A1)
- CIPLE - Certificado inicial de português língua estrangeira (Level A2)
- DEPLE - Diploma elementar de português língua estrangeira (Level B1)
- DIPLE - Diploma intermédio de português língua estrangeira (Level B2)
- DAPLE - Diploma avançado de português língua estrangeira (Level C1)
- DUPLE - Diploma universitário de português língua estrangeira (Level C2)

== Romanian ==
- Romanian Language Institute (not to be confused with Romanian Cultural Institute)
  - Certificat de competență lingvistică
- University of Bucharest
  - Certificat CLS ("Centrul de Limbi Străine")
- Babeș-Bolyai University (Cluj-Napoca)
  - Atestat de limba română (B2 only)
- ECL Examination System
  - Certificat ECL (A2/B1/B2/C1)

== Russian ==
- Test of Russian as a Foreign Language
- TELC - The European Language Certificates

== Serbian ==
- Nacionalni sertifikat o poznavanju srpskog jezika organised by the Department of Philology of the Univerzitet u Beogradu

== Slovak ==
- Certificate of Slovak language proficiency. Levels: A2, B1, B2, C1, C2.
- ECL - European Consortium for the Certificate of Attainment in Modern Languages

== Slovene ==
- Izpit iz znanja slovenščine. Levels: A1 (Breakthrough), A2/B1 (Basic), B2 (Intermediate), C1/C2 (Advanced). Offered by the Department of Philosophy of the Univerza v Ljubljani

== Spanish ==
- DELE - Diplomas de Español como Lengua Extranjera. Levels: A1, A2, B1, B2, C1, C2.
- SIELE - Servicio Internacional de Evaluación de la Lengua Española. Levels: A1, A2, B1, B2, C1
- CELA - Certificado de Español como Lengua Adicional del Centro de Enseñanza para Extranjeros (CEPE) de la Universidad Nacional Autónoma de México (UNAM). 3 Levels: Independent Level (B1), Advanced Level (B2) and Proficiency Level (C2)
- CELU - Certificado de Español: Lengua y Uso, Certificate of Spanish: Language and use.
- Certificado de las Escuelas Oficiales de Idiomas, Spain - Diploma de español, level "Básico" - A2, "Intermedio" - B1, "Avanzado" - B2, C1
- ECL - Consorcio Europeo para el Certificado en Lenguas Modernas
- LanguageCert USAL esPro Comprensión auditiva y de lectura
- LanguageCert USAL esPro Expresión escrita
- LanguageCert USAL esPro Expresión oral
- TELC - The European Language Certificates

== Spanish Sign Language ==
- The University of Granada offers a course in Spanish Sign Language The exam consists of two parts:
  - Expression (a text for the students to sign)
  - Comprehension (a signed video for the students to write up in a Word document)

== Swedish ==
- Swedex - Swedex consists of three different levels corresponding to the A2, B1 and B2 levels in the Common European Framework of Reference for Languages. It can be taken in examination centres in twenty-five different countries. Swedex tests the skills of the student in five different areas: vocabulary, grammar, listening, writing and reading.
- TISUS - Test in Swedish for University Studies is another certificate, often used as a proof of competence in Swedish to gain access to Swedish universities.
- Stockholm Chamber of Commerce Certificate in Business Swedish
- Allmänna språkexamina, Ulbildningsstyrelse (Finland)

== Tamil ==
- AJA Tamil Language Assessment

== Thai ==
- The Thai Competency Test for foreigners is arranged by the Ministry of Education.
- The Chulalongkorn University Proficiency Test of Thai as a Foreign Language (CU-TFL) : CU-TFL is a standardized proficiency test for speakers of Thai as a foreign language designed by the Sirindhorn Thai Language Institute, Chulalongkorn University, located in Bangkok.
- TPA - The School of Language and Culture of the Technology Promotion Association (Thailand-Japan) offers its own Thai proficiency test.

== Turkish ==
- Turkish Proficiency Exam - Türkçe Yeterlik Sınavı (TYS)
- UTS - Distance Turkish Test (Uzaktan Türkçe Sınavı)
- TELC - The European Language Certificates

== Uyghur ==
- Uyghur Proficiency Testing Project offered by Indiana University Bloomington

== Vietnamese ==
- VINATEST - Kỳ thi đánh giá năng lực Tiếng Việt, Hanoi University.
- NLTV - Kỳ thi năng lực Tiếng Việt (VNS), VNU-HCM University of Social Sciences and Humanities.
- VIETEST - Hệ thống đánh giá năng lực tiếng Việt cho người nước ngoài, VNU University of Social Sciences and Humanities.
- IVPT - International Vietnamese Proficiency Test (Kỳ Thi Năng Lực Tiếng Việt Quốc Tế) was designed by Center for Vietnamese Studies at National Cheng Kung University (Taiwan) for the speakers of Vietnamese as second language in Taiwan.
- ViLT - Kỳ thi năng lực tiếng Việt (Japanese: 実用ベトナム語技能検定試験) by J-TAG (日本東南アジア言語普及交流協会)

== Welsh ==
- WJEC offers Defnyddio'r Gymraeg tests at Mynediad (Entry) level, Sylfaen (Foundation) level, Canolradd (Intermediate) and Uwch (Advanced) level.
