= English Language Proficiency Test =

Former American aptitude test

The English Language Proficiency Test (ELPT) was the name of a SAT II last administered in January 2005. It was a one-hour multiple choice test given on English language proficiency by The College Board. A student whose native language was not English could have chosen to take this test instead of or in addition to Test of English as a Foreign Language (TOEFL) for college entrance depending upon requirements of the schools in which the student was planning to apply. Until 1994, the SAT II's were known as Achievement Tests. The ELPT assessed both the understanding of spoken and written standard American English and the ability to function in a classroom where English is spoken. The test was intended for students whose best language was not English; who attend U.S. high schools, or who had studied in an international school where courses were taught in English; had completed two to four years of English language instruction in an English as a Second Language program or in English enrichment courses; or students who spoke a language other than English at home or work. It was scored on a scale of 901 to 999.

English Language Proficiency Testing is also important in aviation. Pilots and air traffic controllers have to demonstrate English language competency in accordance with ICAO Document 9835 in order to be allowed to exercise the privileges, either as Air Traffic Controllers, or the privileges endorsed in their pilot´s license when operating outside of their national airspace. However, an entirely different scoring (“rating”) system from LEVEL 1 to LEVEL 6 is used. Pilots have to demonstrate at least ICAO Level 4.

== Format ==
The test had 84 multiple-choice questions and was divided into three sections: two listening sections totaling 30 minutes and one 30-minute reading section.

== Format in Aviation ==
The test for the aviation community consists of two parts: the first part, called the "digital part" contains a number of questions from a data base which are played. The second part is an interview which lasts for at least 15 minutes and which is conducted by a language examiner. This type of testing is referred to as "semi-direct" test.

== Scoring ==
The following is the final release of score percentiles as seen on the 2007 SAT score reports. The mean score was 964.

Score	Percentile
999	99+
995	99
990	92
985	84
980	75
975	66
970	57
965	47
960	38
955	31
950	23
945	17
940	12
935	9
930	5
925	3
920	1
915	1-
910	1-
905	-
901	-

== See also ==
- ACT (examination), a college entrance exam, competitor to the SAT.
- City & Guilds English Language Qualifications (in London in the UK)
- English language learning and teaching
- IELTS
- List of admissions tests.
- PSAT/NMSQT.
- SAT
- SAT Subject Tests
- TOEFL
- TOEIC
- UBELT University of Bath English Language Test
- WorkKeys
- Pearson Test of English Academic
- TrackTest English language proficiency test solution for schools and companies
