= Test of English Proficiency =

Test of English Proficiency may refer to:

- International Test of English Proficiency
- TEPS, or Test of English Proficiency developed by Seoul National University

== See also ==
- Oxford Test of English
