= Washback effect =

Impact of testing on pedagogy

Washback effect refers to the impact of testing on curriculum design, teaching practices, and learning behaviors. The influences of testing can be found in the choices of learners and teachers: teachers may teach directly for specific test preparation, or learners might focus on specific aspects of language learning found in assessments. Washback effect in testing is typically seen as either negative, or positive (sometimes referred to as washforward). Washback may be considered harmful to more fluid approaches in language education where definitions of language ability may be limited; however, it may be considered beneficial when good teaching practices result. Washback can also be positive or negative in that it either maintains or hinders the accomplishment of educational goals. In positive washback, teaching the curriculum becomes the same as teaching to a specific test. Negative washback occurs in situations where there may be a mismatch between the stated goals of instruction and the focus of assessment; it may lead to the abandonment of instructional goals in favor of test preparation.

The effect of a test on learning and teaching is a concept discussed as early as the 19th century. Research into washback can be traced back to the early 1980s, when the influence of tests on teaching and learning was first seen as a potential source of bias due to the accountability of test feedback loops. As the results of tests became more important to students (gatekeepers to future prospects), teachers (evaluation), schools (funding), and states (lawsuits), test preparation as a function of teaching became essential. Tests were made to be economical, using multiple-choice questions and focusing on psychometric validity, but perhaps not measuring more complex abilities. Schools and teachers were accountable for student test performance, and thus focused on the skills and outcomes that the tests measured. Given the dynamic interaction between testing and education, the term systemic validity was used to refer to the ways in which a test leads to changes in instruction intended to develop cognitive skills that are being measured by a test.

Research has shown the variable extent to which washback influences different individuals in different ways, and the difficulty of targeting washback. Significant variability has been noted in the ways that teachers respond to test changes and classroom assessments. Effects may be superficial, indirect, and unpredictable due to individual differences in the way that learning is mediated by teachers, textbook writers, and publishers.

== In English language assessment ==
With globalization, the world has witnessed an increase in the internationalization of higher education, which has resulted in a dramatic increase in the number of international students in the last 25 years. The prominence of English alongside this internationalization process has also seen the use of international tests of English such as Test of English for International Communication (TOEIC), Test of English as a Foreign Language (TOEFL), and International English Language Testing System (IELTS) as standard tools in the wider learning community. The increasing weight of these tools in education raises questions about the impact of such tests on teaching and learning, with suggestions that language skills are suffering due to the impact of tests. As English as an International Language (EIL) continues to become more stable through the establishment of clearer features of context-driven English, it is inevitable that there will be significant debate on language norms and proficiency regarding teaching and assessment. The field of applied linguistics should expect to see more specific discussion on the recognition of the way language norms are influenced by use and context, but this remains an unsolved problem in the area of language assessment.

== See also ==
- List of language proficiency tests
- Language proficiency
- Teaching to the test, an example of washback
