= Ahn Byong-man =

South Korean academic and university administrator (1941–2022)

President of Hankuk University of Foreign Studies
- In office 1994–2004
- Succeeded by: Park Chul

Personal details
- Born: 8 February 1941 Keijō, Korea, Empire of Japan
- Died: 31 May 2022 (aged 81)
- Education: University of Florida; Seoul National University

- Korean name
- Hangul: 안병만
- Hanja: 安秉萬
- RR: An Byeongman
- MR: An Pyŏngman

Ahn Byong-man (8 February 1941 – 31 May 2022) was a South Korean academic, and the former President of Hankuk University of Foreign Studies. He received his bachelor's and master's degrees from the Seoul National University in 1964 and 1967, and went on to the University of Florida for doctoral studies, graduating in 1973. In 1975 he joined the faculty of Hankuk University of Foreign Studies in Seoul, South Korea. While at this institution he served as the Dean of Student Affairs, Dean of the Graduate School, and in 1994 he was named president. He served in this capacity until 2004.

Ahn was a Fulbright Scholar-in-Residence at the University of Delaware, and received an honorary doctorate of humane letters from the University of Delaware in 2004. He was also a visiting professor at the university. He also received a University of Florida Distinguished Alumnus Award in May 2005.

A non-party politician, he served as Minister for Education, Science and Technology in the Lee Myung-bak government from 6 August 2008 until 30 August 2010. During his tenure, he pushed through an ambitious reform of English-as-a-foreign-language education in South Korea to reduce the reliance on hagwon in teaching the language. One of the first steps he took in this regard was to begin the development of a new English proficiency test modeled on Japan's STEP Eiken test, the National English Ability Test, with the aim of replacing the TOEIC and TOEFL for domestic purposes such as university admissions and job candidate selection. Around the same time, he also requested the resignations of seven senior officials in the Ministry.
