= Shafston College =

Private college in Queensland, Australia

- Motto: Amicitia Et Doctrina "Friendship and Learning"
- Type: Private tertiary institution
- Established: 1996
- Director: Peter Wei
- Location: Brisbane, Queensland, Australia; 27.47608°S 153.03938°E
- Website: shafston.edu

Shafston International College is a private education institution for international students located in Brisbane and the Gold Coast, Queensland, Australia. It offers vocational training, Adult English language programs, High School Preparation, Study Tour and University Pathway programs. In November 2020, it was announced that Shafston would temporarily close, with the building and contents to be auctioned. In the mid of 2021, Shafston International College has completed the ownership transition and re-open the campus to the international market.

Shafston was established in 1996 and has grown rapidly with over 70,000 students having attended since its inception. Shafston has a diverse student population with over 40 different nationalities on campus at any given time.

Shafston features four campuses, one in the heart of Brisbane, two in Southport on the Gold Coast and the other in Sydney. The original Kangaroo Point Campus, which is centred on Shafston House, a heritage-listed building constructed in 1851, is located on the banks of the Brisbane River and covers an area of five-acres. The Sydney campus which is nearby Hyde Park will open at the beginning of 2025 for Study Tour and English Language Programs.

Shafston is accredited by the National ELT Accreditation Scheme (NEAS) and a member of English Australia. The college is a Public Testing Centre for TOEIC (Test of English for International Communication) and TOEFL Testing Centre (Test of English as a Foreign Language), and a preparation centre for University of Cambridge ESOL Examinations. Shafston’s Kangaroo Point and Gold Coast campuses are also home to Shafston Cambridge Exam Centre, approved by the University of Cambridge to administer ESOL examinations in south-east Queensland. Shafston also offers TESOL accreditation.

Shafston College has been rocked by a series of scandals, with regular appearances on television current affairs shows leaving the reputation of the college somewhat tainted. In 2004, the former college president, Keith Lloyd, was accused of paying teenage students for sex. This was widely reported in the Australian and overseas media and featured a secretly taped conversation. In early 2008, the college was again in the news as reports surfaced of lecturers directed that "no student should fail" a tertiary level nursing course because "you can't do this because students are paying good money for the course". The resultant media coverage and subsequent investigation of practices at Shafston College resulted in the course being deaccredited by the Queensland Nursing Council. In September 2011, it was reported in the media that Shafston could possibly face liquidation proceedings in the Supreme Court over unpaid commissions to an agent; the matter was subsequently settled out of court.

In July 2011, the Shafston House Estate celebrated its 160th year.

In 2024, Shafston was a finalist in the International Education and Training category of the Premier of Queensland's Export Awards 2024.

The Kangaroo Point and Gold Coast campuses host the college English programs;

- General English
- IELTS Preparation
- High School Preparation
- Primary English Preparation
- Cambridge English exam preparation courses (PET, FCE, CAE, CPE)
- IELTS
- TOEFL
- TOEIC
- TESOL

The Kangaroo Point campus hosts the college's business programs;

- Diploma of Business
- Certificate IV in Business
- Diploma of Leadership and Management
- Diploma of Project Management
- Certificate IV of Early Child Education and Care
- Diploma of Early Child Education and Care
