= TELC =

TELC may refer to:

- Telč, a town in southern Moravia, in the Czech Republic
- Tamil Evangelical Lutheran Church, in India
- The European Language Certificates or TELC, language exam
