= United Nations Associations Test of English =

Test of English administered in Japan

- Acronym: UNATE, 国連英検
- Type: standardized test
- Administrator: United Nations Association of Japan
- Skills tested: English
- Offered: twice a year
- Regions: Japan
- Website: www.kokureneiken.jp

The United Nations Associations Test of English (国際連合公用語英語検定試験, kokusai rengō kōyōgo eigo kentei shiken; abbreviated as UNATE) is a standardized test of English administered by the United Nations Association of Japan, a public interest incorporated foundation. It is supported by the Ministry of Foreign Affairs of Japan.

== Overview ==
The United Nations designates as its official languages English, French, Chinese, Russian, Spanish, and Arabic; the United Nations Associations Test of English is to evaluate the examinees’ proficiency in English. Although the title of the test includes the words “United Nations,” the sponsor is not the United Nations, but, rather, it is a test conducted only in Japan, administrated by the United Nations Association of Japan, a member of the World Federation of United Nations Associations, which is a class-A advisory NGO for the United Nations, receiving the United Nations flag from its Headquarters.

This exam is held twice a year. There are six levels: Superior A (特A級, toku ei kyū; most difficult), A, B, C, D, and E. It is possible to take two exams for adjacent levels simultaneously. The levels C and E exams consist of one examination of a multiple-choice test. B level exams consist of both multiple choice and English composition and only require one exam to pass. For Superior A and A levels, examinees must pass the first exam that consists of a multiple-choice section and an English composition section and then the secondary exam involving an interview with a native speaker of English (B level also required interviews until 2005). This interview requires appropriate responses to a wide range of topics including politeness, social awareness, interest in global events, and aspirations for the use of the examinees’ English skills in their future careers. Another major feature is the inclusion of current events in the exam questions. Unlike other exams, general knowledge is also included in this exam.

There are other standardized tests of English proficiency such as the Practical English Proficiency Test, but the United Nations Associations Test of English specifically requires knowledge of the UN and international politics. Examinees who take Level B or above must read New Today's Guide to the United Nations by the United Nations Association of Japan.

== United Nations English Proficiency Junior Test ==
The United Nations Association of Japan also conducts the United Nations English Proficiency Junior Test for children. Generally, the Level E exam includes vocabulary such as animals, colors, and flowers and with each additional level, new subjects are added. The vocabulary is expanded from daily life to school life and interests, and the highest-level A includes 1,200 intermediate level words learned in junior high school in order to test English skills used in everyday communication in society. The test adopts the method of listening to English and then choosing the correct answer from the illustrations on the answer sheet (for pre-A and above levels, selections are made on English words instead of images, and Level A has additional reading comprehension questions. Level E has 25 questions (30 minute), while Level A 80 questions (50 minutes).

== Benefits of passing the United Nations Associations Test of English ==
- Since 2007, the Superior A level exam has been used as a screening test for associate experts, a category of international civil servants (personnel deployed through the Ministry of Foreign Affairs in a two-year contract).
- Superior A and A levels qualify for a reserve personnel appointment of the Japan Self-Defense Forces (open recruitment for specialists).
- Level C or higher can be used as qualifications during the first round of police recruitment examinations conducted by the Metropolitan Police Department.
- Those who pass Level C or higher may be given priority in the admission process for universities and graduate schools, may receive preferential treatment added to their transcripts, or may be authorized for English language course credits after entering school.
- Those who pass Level C or higher are exempted from the English section of the High School Graduation Qualification Examination.
