= Oxford Test of English Advanced =

Advanced proficiency test for learners of English

- Acronym: OTE Advanced
- Type: Standardized test
- Administrator: Oxford University Press
- Skills tested: Speaking, Listening, Reading, and Writing of the English language
- Purpose: To assess the English language proficiency of non-native English speakers
- Year started: 2024; 2 years ago
- Duration: Speaking: Approx. 15 minutes. Listening: Approx. 35 minutes, Reading: 35 minutes, Writing: 50 minutes, Total: Approx. 2 hours 15 minutes.
- Score range: 0 to 170.
- Score validity: Scores are valid for life
- Offered: Available on demand at approved test centres
- Restrictions on attempts: Can be retaken up to four times a year; maximum twice in any 8-week period
- Regions: Available globally
- Languages: English
- Prerequisites: No official prerequisite. Intended for non-native English speakers.
- Fee: Check with local approved test centre
- Website: www.oxfordtestofenglish.com

The Oxford Test of English Advanced (OTE Advanced) is a test in the Oxford Test of English suite, alongside the Oxford Test of English and the Oxford Test of English for Schools. The Oxford Test of English Advanced is an on-demand computer-adaptive test of English proficiency for non-native speakers of English, reporting at B2 and C1 levels of the Common European Framework of Reference (CEFR). The test was developed by Oxford University Press (OUP) to provide learners of English with a quick, reliable way to prove their level of English proficiency for university entrance and employment. The test is endorsed and certified by the University of Oxford. The test is recognized by universities including the University of Oxford and is available worldwide.

== Test launch and recognition ==
The Oxford Test of English Advanced was launched in April 2024 to meet the needs of higher education admissions and employers with launch events in Turkey, Italy, Argentina, Peru, Colombia and Spain. The test is recognized worldwide by over 700 organizations, including the University of Oxford, Humboldt University, CIDEX, and Universitat de Barcelona.

== Test design ==
The Oxford Test of English Advanced was developed to meet the needs of recognizing institutions for an English proficiency test at B2 and C1 level which tests real-life skills required to operate in academic and professional domains. The test specifications are informed by the CEFR companion volume and the British Association of Lecturers in English for Academic Purposes (BALEAP) Can Do Framework for EAP syllabus design and assessment, with a particular focus on mediation, operationalized in a number of integrated skills tasks closely correlated with academic success, including note-taking and summarizing tasks. For example, Du (2014) found that "summarization skill does play an essential role in L2 undergraduate students’ academic literacy experiences across the disciplines."

A further consideration in the test design was washback effect. Tasks in the test were selected to be teachable, learnable, and have a positive effect on academic success. For example, a meta-analysis by Beesley and Apthorp (2001) identified summarizing as a key academic skill for promoting learning. The authors repeated the meta analysis on a larger data set in 2010, the conclusion of which was consistent with the original findings, that "note taking and summarizing are robust instructional strategies in terms of improving student learning."

== Test specifications ==
=== Modules ===
The Oxford Test of English Advanced consists of four modules: Speaking, Listening, Reading, and Writing. Modules can be taken individually or in any combination.

MODULE	PART	TEST FOCUS
Speaking	1	Interview: Six spoken questions on personal topics.
	2	Voice message: Leaving a diplomatic voice message in response to a tricky situation.
	3	Summary: Listening to two experts, taking notes, and orally summarizing the main points the experts made.
	4	Debate: Putting a case in response to a debate question, sustaining a position for two minutes.
	5	Follow-up questions: Four questions related to the topic of the Part 4 debate.
Listening	1	Five discrete short monologues/dialogues, each with one 3-option multiple-choice question.
	2	A longer monologue with a note-completion task.
	3	A longer dialogue with a task focusing on identifying opinions and attitudes
	4	Five discrete short monologues/dialogues, each with one 3-option multiple-choice question.
Reading	1	Six short texts each with one 3-option multiple-choice question.
	2	Matching seven propositions to three profiles OR matching six profiles to four texts.
	3	Replacing six extracted sentences into a text.
	4	A text with five questions.
Writing	1	Essay: Writing an essay, including two prompts.
	2	Summary: Reading two extracts on the same topic (a textbook extract and a lecture transcription) and writing a summary, synthesizing the main points in the texts.

=== Computer adaptive ===
The Listening and Reading modules of the Oxford Test of English use computer-adaptive testing (CATs). Computer adaptive tests can be more efficient and provide more precise measurement than traditional tests. The adaptive test works by selecting each successive question from a large bank of questions, based on the test taker's response to the previous question. The gains in efficiency make for shorter tests, and there is evidence that this may reduce the amount of stress a test taker feels during the test, though some research has suggested that there is no relation between CATs and test anxiety or that CATs may introduce other causes of stress.

=== Human marking ===
The Speaking and Writing modules are marked by trained assessors. Test takers' responses are divided between different assessors for marking. For the Writing module, the Part 1 essay response is marked by one assessor, and the Part 2 summary response is marked by another assessor, each marking on four criteria: Task fulfillment, Organization, Grammar, and Lexis. The marks from the two assessors are combined and converted into a standardized score for Writing. For the Speaking module, responses to Part 1 (interview), 2 (voice message), and 3 (summary) are sent to one assessor, while Parts 3 (debate) and 4 (follow-up questions) are sent to a separate assessor. Each assessor marks on four criteria: Task fulfillment, Pronunciation and fluency, Grammar, and Lexis. The marks from the two assessors are combined and converted into a standardized score for Speaking.

==== Marking quality assurance ====
Marking quality by assessors is managed through a system of training and certification before marking, and the use of 'seeds', pre-calibrated scripts which the assessor must mark within tolerance in line with best practice set out by the Joint Council on Qualifications (JCQ). Marking out of tolerance leads to the assessor being re-standardized, retrained or suspended from marking.

== Results ==
For test takers who have taken all four modules, a certificate is issued showing the CEFR level and standardized score for each module, and an overall CEFR level and overall score. Where three or fewer modules have been taken, a report card is issued for each module. Certificates reflect a test taker's best performance, so if a test taker re-takes a module and their performance improves, the improved score will be reflected in their certificate. Certificate results are for life, though receiving institutions such as universities may require results to be within a particular time frame.

Results for the Listening and Reading modules are available immediately after the completion of the test. Speaking and Writing results are available within five days.

The CEFR levels and standardized scores are shown in this table:

CEFR	Standardized score
C1.2	156-170
C1.1	141-155
B2.2	126-140
B2.1	111-125

== Test security ==
Test security is aligned to best practice set out by the International Test Commission, utilizing a number of measures to maintain test security and the integrity of the test results, including invigilated test administration at approved test centres, computer-adaptive testing harnessing artificial intelligence to reduce opportunities for copying, and additional measures to deter, prevent, detect, and deal with malpractice.

== Reasonable adjustments ==
In line with the Equality Act 2010 and European Accessibility Act, the test can be taken with a range of accessibility accommodations, including display options for colour blindness, breaks during the test, and additional time.
