= Test of Russian as a Foreign Language =

Russian language proficiency test

The Test of Russian as a Foreign Language (TORFL) (Russian: Тест по русскому языку как иностранному, romanized: Test po russkomu yazyku kak inostrannomu or ТРКИ) is a contemporary test of Russian language for foreign citizens compliant with the best European quality standards.

== Levels ==
Levels of the Test of Russian as a Foreign Language are matched to the Common European Framework of Reference for Languages: Learning, Teaching, Assessment (CEFR).

The TORFL test consists of 6 levels:

- Elementary Level (TEL / A1) — Successful performance at the Test at Elementary Level represents a standard of initial competence in Russian which demonstrates a candidate can satisfy their elementary communicative needs in a limited number of everyday situations. The certificate of Elementary Level proves the competences of candidate for further language learning and achievement of Basic Level of Russian language proficiency.
- Basic Level (TBL / A2) — Successful performance at the Test at Basic Level represents a standard competence in Russian which demonstrates a candidate can satisfy their basic communicative needs in a limited number of situations in everyday and cultural spheres. This level stands for the minimum level required to obtain Russian citizenship. At the same time this level is not sufficient for studying in the Russian educational institutions, except for preparatory faculties (programs or courses) for foreigners.
- The First Certification Level (TORFL-I / B1) — Successful performance at the First Level Certificate indicates an intermediate level of language competence, which demonstrates a candidate can satisfy their main communicative needs in everyday, cultural, educational and professional spheres in line with the State Standard of Competence in Russian as a Foreign Language. In addition, the First Level Certificate allows its holder to apply to a Russian university.
- The Second Level Certificate (TORFL-II / B2) — Successful performance at the Second Level Certificate indicates a high level of competence in Russian which demonstrates a candidate can satisfy their communicative needs in a wide range of situations in cultural, educational and professional spheres. It allows its holder to receive bachelor's, master's and PhD degrees from Russian universities, excluding certain philology-related subjects. This level also allows one to carry out professional activities in the Russian language in the related subject areas: humanitarian sciences (except for philology), engineering, natural sciences, etc.
- The Third Level Certificate (TORFL-III / C1) — Successful performance at the Third Level Certificate indicates that the candidate has a high level of language command in all communicative contexts, which allows them to conduct professional activity in Russian in areas such as Linguistics, Translation, Editing, Journalism, International Relations and Management.
- The Fourth Level Certificate (TORFL-IV / C2) — Successful performance at the Fourth Level Certificate indicates Proficiency in Russian and the candidate's language competence close to a native Russian-speaker. It also enables its holder to receive a Master of Arts degree in philology, undertake all forms of work in Russian philology.

The Language Testing Centre of Saint Petersburg University and the Testing Center of the Herzen State Pedagogical University are organizing testing sessions in accordance with the Federal Law of the Russian Federation № 115 from 25 June 2002. On the legal status of the foreign citizens in the Russian Federation and the order of the Ministry of Education and Science of the Russian Federation № 1156 from 28 August 2014. On the approval of the form and procedure of the examination in Russian language, history of Russia and fundamentals of legislation of the Russian Federation and requirements on the minimum level of knowledge requisite for the stated exam.

== Test Content ==
The Test of Russian as a Foreign Language comprises 5 parts examining language competences: writing, vocabulary/grammar, reading, listening and speaking.

Usually the exam is held over a period of 2 days. On the first day candidates take the "Writing", "Vocabulary/Grammar" and “Reading" parts, on the second day – "Listening" and "Speaking" parts. The TORFL test assesses foreign citizens' skills to express various communicative intentions in the writing form using correct words and phrases, to understand different types of written information in Russian, to comprehend information in Russian given aurally, to participate in dialogues and to produce the monologue according to the proposed subject.

SPbU has organized TORFL since 1997. The TORFL system was created by Saint-Petersburg University and Moscow State University. However, testing and assessment materials and basic requirements are created by SPbU. Nowadays question papers for the TORFL test are compiled by the experts of each educational organization authorized to run the Test, e.g. St. Petersburg University question papers are compiled by St. Petersburg University, Herzen University question papers are compiled by Herzen University experts, Moscow State University question papers are compiled by MSU experts and so on.

== Procedure of issuing certificates ==
After successfully passing a test, a foreign citizen receives the TORFL certificate confirming the person's level of language competence in Russian as a foreign language. The form and procedure of issuing the TORFL certificates are determined by the Order of the Ministry of education and science of the Russian Federation of 25 April 2014 No. 412.

This Order states that 10 days is the maximum period for issuing a certificate, but the testing organizations seek to do this faster. For example, St. Petersburg University and Herzen University issue a TORFL certificate on the next day after exam. SPbU issues a reference in national languages with grades for each subtest attached to the certificate.

== Testing centres ==
By the Order of the Ministry of Education and Science of the Russian Federation of 6 July 2019 No.471 the list of educational organizations conducting testing of Russian as a foreign language includes 13 educational organizations, for example: St. Petersburg State University, Herzen University, Moscow State University, Pskov State University, RUDN University and Pushkin State Russian Language Institute.

The universities listed in the Order are the only organizations authorized to conduct the TORFL test. However, some universities have partner organizations in various regions of Russia and in foreign countries. For instance, SPbU has the largest number of partners—approximately 112 organizations in 50 countries. Moreover, SPbU is organizing online TORFL sessions, which gives people around the world the opportunity to take TORFL with SPbU specialists.

== Level comparison with common EFL tests, ALTE and CEFR ==
TORFL	ALTE level	CEFR	ESOL exam	IELTS Band	TOEIC Total Score	TOEFL PBT Total Score
Level 4	Level 5	C2	CPE	8.5–9	—	—
Level 3	Level 4	C1	CAE	7–8	950+	270+
Level 2	Level 3	B2	FCE	5.5–6.5	785–949	227–269
Level 1	Level 2	B1	PET	4–5	550–784	163–226
Basic	Level 1	A2	KET	3–3.5	225–549	96–162
Elementary	Breakthrough	A1	—	1–2.5	120–224	—
