= ETS v. New Oriental School =

- Court: Beijing High Court
- Full case name: Educational Testing Service v. Beijing Haidian District Private New Oriental School
- Decided: 27 Dec 2004
- Citations: Civil Judgment, People's Republic of China, Beijing High Court (2004)

ETS V. New Oriental School represents a landmark case in the People's Republic of China for the protection of foreign copyrights under the Berne Convention.

== Background ==
The New Oriental School in Beijing had provided access to TOEFL test forms on its website and in the classroom for their students. They had previously struck an agreement with ETS for the use of the TOEFL test forms, but the extent of the use of the test forms went beyond the scope of the agreement. Furthermore, the agreement ended in 1998; at which time New Oriental School continued to provide access to the test forms.

== ETS v. New Oriental School ==
ETS brought action in the Beijing Intermediate Court for copyright infringement under the Berne Convention that required the Chinese government to protect the literary and artistic works of United States' Citizens. They also claimed trademark infringement for the "TOEFL" trademark that had been registered in China previously.

The Beijing Intermediate Court decided for ETS on both accounts. Ordering New Oriental to cease the distribution of all TOEFL materials, to cease the use of the "TOEFL" trademark, and awarded ETS RMB 5 million.

=== Beijing High Court review ===
New Oriental School appealed the judgment to the Beijing of High Court shortly after the trial court's decision. The Beijing High Court affirmed the ruling of the trial court that ETS's copyright had been infringed under the Berne Convention. However, the Court did not believe that the "TOEFL" trademark had been infringed by simply labeling teaching aids as "TOEFL" prep-materials, due to the test's status as the predominant English equivalency test in China. The damages were lowered to RMB 3.7 million.
