= Hamza test =

Arabic language proficiency test

Hamza Test (اختبار همزة)
- Acronym: Hamza (هَمْزَة)
- Type: Language proficiency test
- Administrator: King Salman Global Academy for Arabic Language
- Skills tested: Reading; Listening; Writing; Speaking
- Purpose: To assess the Arabic language proficiency of non-native speakers.
- Year started: 2023; 3 years ago
- Duration: Listening Comprehension: 35 minutes; Reading Comprehension: 60 minutes; Writing: 40 minutes; Speaking: 20 minutes
- Score range: 130 - 200
- Languages: Arabic
- Annual number of test takers: ▲ Over 2,700 from 60+ nationalities (February 2024 to February 2025).
- Prerequisites: No official prerequisite. Intended for non-native Arabic speakers.
- Fee: Free for the years 2024-2025
- Website: Official website

Hamza Test (Arabic: اخْتِبَارُ هَمْزَة, Ikhtibār Hamzah) is an Arabic-language proficiency test for non-native speakers that assesses non-Arabic speakers' proficiency in four language skills: reading comprehension, listening comprehension, writing and speaking. A standardized criterion-referenced test, the test follows the Common European Framework of Reference for Languages (CEFR) and measures proficiency across four levels, ranging from A2 to C1. The test is held at least once every four months in Saudi Arabia and worldwide, either in person (computer-based) at accredited centers or remotely (online). Test sessions are administered by the King Salman Global Academy for Arabic Language, held domestically and internationally in partnership with accredited local institutions.

On January 15, 2026, the Hamza Test officially joined the Association of Language Testers in Europe (ALTE) as an associate member.

== About ==
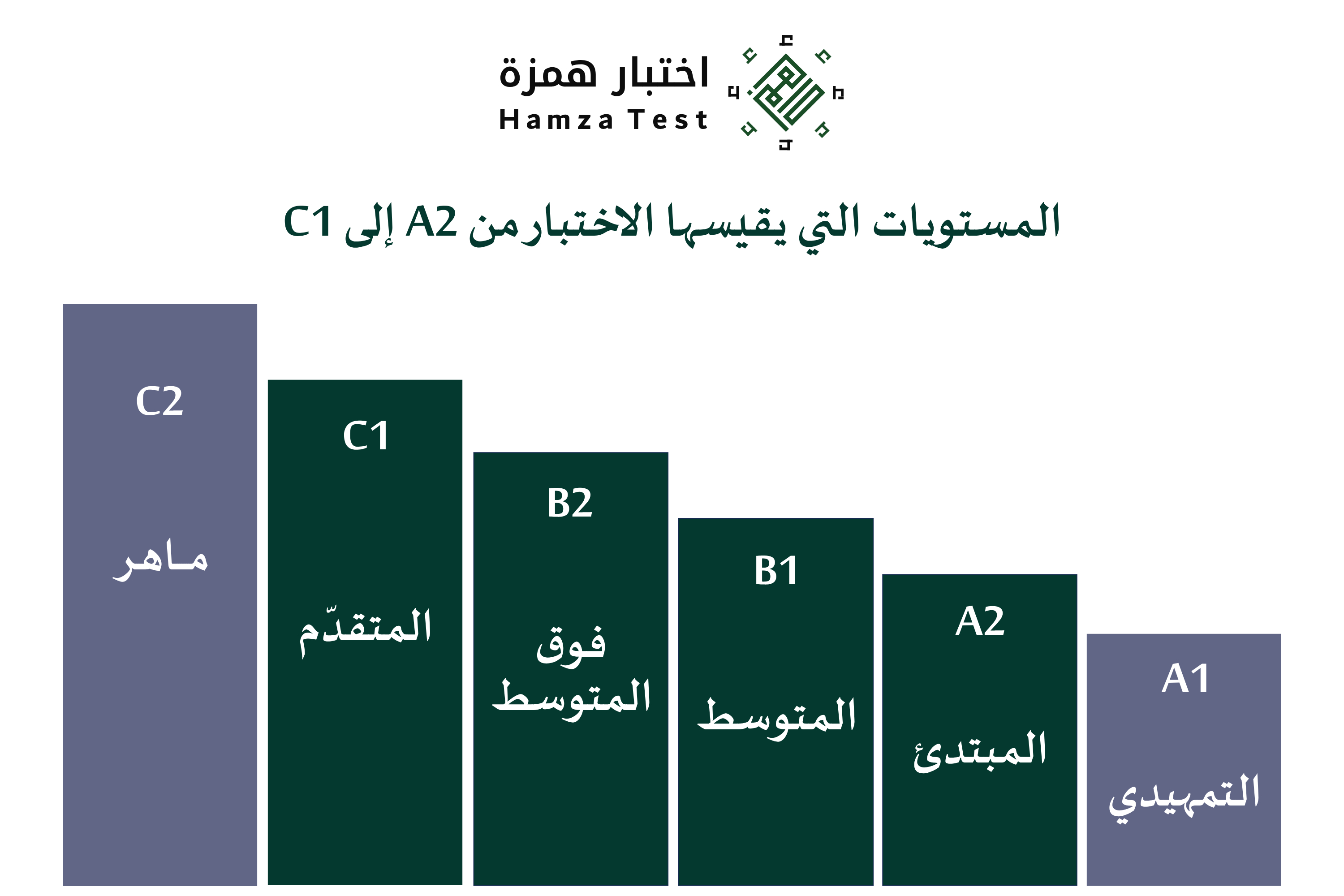
Proficiency levels measured (CEFR: A2 to C1). Not included.

The Hamza Test (Arabic Language Proficiency for Non-Native Speakers for Academic Purposes) is a standardized assessment developed by the King Salman Global Academy for Arabic Language. Launched on 12 December 2023 at the academy's international conference, "Linguistic Testing: Theories, Experiences, and Prospects", the test is aligned with the CEFR standards (Levels A2 to C1) and evaluates four core skills: reading, listening, writing, and speaking.

The test aims to establish an accredited global proficiency standard for non-native learners, providing essential data for universities and language institutes. It aligns with the Human Capability Development Program (part of Saudi Vision 2030) to reinforce the global status of the Arabic language and support its dissemination.

The test employs AI-powered monitoring for both in-person and remote administration. Beyond academic enrollment, the initiative serves labor market requirements by providing a standardized proficiency measure for professional and global institutions.

== Fees ==
Aligned with the King Salman Global Academy for Arabic Language's vision to be a global reference for the Arabic language, the test was provided free of charge during its initial launch (2024–2025). As of early 2026, it has not yet been confirmed whether this free period will be extended or if a fee will be announced.

== Locations and test dates ==
The test is administered globally, both in-person (computer-based) at accredited centers and remotely (virtual proctoring). Sessions are held several times a year, with at least one session every four months. This frequency provides candidates with flexibility to choose dates that fit their academic or professional schedules.

=== Saudi Arabia ===
Registration is provided by the National Center for Assessment (Qiyas) under the Education and Training Evaluation Commission. The test is available at Qiyas testing centers across the Kingdom, the Abjad Center, participating Saudi universities, or through online options.

=== International ===
The test is conducted at accredited global centers and remotely. The King Salman Global Academy for Arabic Language also administers the test during its "Arabic Language Month" held in various countries, including India, Malaysia, Mexico, Italy, and Thailand.

Furthermore, the test is held through scientific partnerships with international educational institutions, such as the United States, specifically at the Saudi Cultural Mission in Fairfax, Virginia, and at Indiana University Bloomington.

== Test format ==
The total test duration is 155 minutes, divided across four sections. The test evaluates four main skills. It begins with Listening Comprehension, featuring academic recordings followed by multiple-choice questions. This is followed by Reading Comprehension, consisting of diverse academic texts and multiple-choice questions. The third section, Writing, requires a 250-word Arabic essay. The test concludes with Speaking, where the examinee discusses a general topic or participates in a simulated dialogue after brief preparation.
