= Vietnamese Language Proficiency Test =

Standardized test of Vietnamese language proficiency for non-native speakers

The Vietnamese Language Proficiency Test (Vietnamese: Kỳ thi năng lực tiếng Việt, abbreviated NLTV or NLTV VNS) is a standardized examination designed to assess the Vietnamese language proficiency of non-native speakers, particularly international students, professionals, and expatriates. Administered by the Center for Vietnamese Language for Foreigners at the VNU-HCM University of Social Sciences and Humanities, the test evaluates four core language skills and aligns with the six-level Vietnamese Language Proficiency Framework (KNLTV), which corresponds to the Common European Framework of Reference for Languages (CEFR).

Certificates issued upon passing are valid for two years and are widely recognized for university admissions, employment in Vietnamese corporations, and immigration purposes requiring proof of language competency. The test is offered five times annually—in March, May, July, September, and November—and has gained international traction, with sessions conducted abroad, including in Japan.

== History ==
The NLTV was developed to standardize the evaluation of Vietnamese as a foreign language, addressing the growing demand from global learners amid Vietnam's economic integration. Launched by USSH VNU-HCMC in the early 2010s, it draws from the national KNLTV framework established by the Ministry of Education and Training. Early iterations focused on domestic administration, but by 2019, the test expanded internationally, attracting over 700 participants in a single session in Tokyo, including learners up to age 83. Sample questions from these sessions, noted for their linguistic complexity, have highlighted the test's rigorous design for advanced non-native users.

Distinct from parallel assessments like VINATEST (Hanoi University) and VIETEST (USSH VNU-Hanoi), the NLTV VNS emphasizes comprehensive skill integration tailored to southern Vietnamese dialects and cultural contexts.

== Format ==
The test comprises four sections, each scored out of 10 points, with a total duration of approximately 3–4 hours. Candidates must achieve a passing score in all sections to qualify for certification.

1. Listening: 55 multiple-choice questions on audio comprehension; 60 minutes.
2. Reading: 40 multiple-choice questions assessing text interpretation; 60 minutes.
3. Speaking: 15-minute oral interview involving topic-based discussion and role-playing.
4. Writing: 60 minutes for tasks including cloze exercises, formal correspondence (e.g., email), and argumentative essays.

Results are typically available within five working days via the official portal.

== Scoring and recognition ==
Individual skill scores are averaged to determine an overall proficiency level on a 1.0–10.0 scale. Levels map to the KNLTV and CEFR as follows:

Level	Score Range	Equivalent Hours of Study	CEFR Alignment
1 (Elementary)	1.0–1.5	160	A1
2 (Elementary)	2.0–3.5	320	A2
3 (Intermediate)	4.0–5.5	480	B1
4 (Intermediate)	6.0–7.0	640	B2
5 (Advanced)	7.5–8.5	720	C1
6 (Advanced)	9.0–10.0	800	C2

Certificates are issued by USSH VNU-HCMC and endorsed under the national framework, facilitating access to Vietnamese higher education and professional opportunities.

== Preparation ==
Preparation courses, offered by the administering center and affiliated institutions, span 20 sessions and align with the six-level framework. Sample tests and audio materials are available online, emphasizing idiomatic usage and cultural nuances. International candidates often utilize resources from partner organizations in Japan and Taiwan.

== See also ==
- List of language proficiency tests
