= Arabic Competency Test =

Standardized test for Arabic language

- Type: Language proficiency test
- Administrator: King Salman Global Academy for Arabic Language
- Year started: 2022
- Regions: Arab world
- Languages: Arabic
- Country of origin: Saudi Arabia

Arabic Competency Test (Arabic: اختبار كفايات اللغة العربية) is a standardized test developed in Saudi Arabia to evaluate and certify Arabic language proficiency for non-native speakers, covering reading, writing, listening and speaking. The first phase of the project to build the test was officially launched on June 12, 2022 and is developed by the King Salman Global Academy for Arabic Language in cooperation with the Saudi Education and Training Evaluation Commission.
