= EF Standard English Test =

Standardized English language test

EF Standard English Test (EFSET)
- Acronym: EFSET
- Type: Standardized test. Available in 3 versions: "EFSET English Certificate" "EFSET Quick English Check" and "EFSET 4 Skill check"
- Administrator: EF Education First.
- Skills tested: Listening & reading of the English language.
- Purpose: To enable non-native English speakers to accurately assess their own English language proficiency.
- Year started: 2014
- Duration: EFSET English Certificate: Listening: 25 minutes, Reading: 25 minutes, Total: 50 minutes. EFSET Quick English Check: Total: 15 minutes.
- Score range: 0 to 100, with CEFR, IELTS and TOEFL equivalencies given.
- Score validity: 100% Valid if the student doesn't cheat
- Offered: on demand
- Regions: worldwide (online)
- Languages: English
- Prerequisites: No prerequisite. Intended for non-native English speakers from true beginner to advanced.
- Fee: free
- Website: www.efset.org

The EF Standard English Test is a standardized test of the English language designed for non-native English speakers. It is the product of EF Education First, a global language training company, and a team of language assessment experts including Lyle Bachman, Mari Pearlman, and Ric Luecht. EF compares the EFSET's accuracy to the most widely used high stakes standardized English tests: TOEFL, IELTS, and Cambridge International Examinations.

There are three versions of the EFSET: a 15-minute test which is a quiz type test, a 50-minute test which assesses the reading and listening skills, and a 90-minute test which covers reading, writing, listening and speaking skills. The results are fully aligned with CEFR levels, i.e. the 6-level Common European Framework of Reference for Languages (CEFR). Initially, the test used to evaluate the receptive skills (reading and listening) only, but later the test makers integrated writing and speaking section to the test. Unlike other standardized English tests, the EFSET uses computerized adaptive testing methods to adjust the difficulty of the test according to the examinee's ability level. The EFSET is not a proctored exam.

== Test launch ==
EF Education First initially intended to build the EFSET for internal use. Soon, the company realized it could gain branding benefits from releasing a robust, testing tool for any English learner to use. The initial public launch of the EFSET in 2014 was the result of a 3-year process, which included 15 months of formal trials involving 14,500 students.

== Scoring ==
The EF SET English Certificate is scored on a scale of 0 to 100 with a separate score attributed for reading and listening as well as an overall score. EF SET English Certificate scores are mapped to the 6-level CEFR bands from A1 to C2 as well as to IELTS and TOEFL scores as shown in the table below.

EFSET English Certificate	CEFR	Level	TOEFL	IELTS	Description
1-30	A1	Beginner	N/A	N/A	Understands familiar everyday words, expressions, and very basic phrases aimed at the satisfaction of needs of a concrete type.
31-40	A2	Elementary	N/A	N/A	Understands sentences and frequently used expressions (personal and family information, shopping, local geography, employment)
41-50	B1	Intermediate	57-86	4.0-5.0	Understands the main points of clear, standard input on familiar matters regularly encountered in work, school, & leisure.
51-60	B2	Upper Intermediate	87-99	5.5-6.0	Understands the main ideas of complex text or speech on both concrete and abstract topics, including technical discussions in his field of specialisation.
61-70	C1	Advanced	100-109	6.5-7.5	Understands a wide range of demanding, longer texts, and recognises implicit or nuanced meanings.
71-100	C2	Proficient	110-120	8.0-9.0	Understands with ease virtually every form of material read, including abstract or linguistically complex text such as manuals, specialised articles and literary works, and any kind of spoken language, including live broadcasts delivered at native speed.
