= Test of English Proficiency (South Korea) =

International standardized test

- Acronym: TEPS
- Type: Paper-based standardized test.
- Administrator: Seoul National University
- Skills tested: Reading, listening, speaking and writing of the English language.
- Year started: 1999; 26 years ago
- Languages: English
- Website: https://www.teps.or.kr/

The Test of English Proficiency developed by Seoul National University or TEPS is an English proficiency test created by Seoul National University's Language Education Institute to evaluate South Korean test takers' English language skills. TEPS has been administered nationwide since January 1999. It consists of 200 questions which are divided into four sections: Listening (60 questions, 55 minutes), Grammar (50 questions, 25 minutes), Vocabulary (50 questions, 15 minutes), and Reading (40 questions, 45 minutes). TEPS scores are divided into the ten ratings ranging from 1 + to 5. It is designed to test applicants' communicative English skills and to minimize test-taker reliance on certain strategies such as rote memorization. A study of the test indicated that it is valid and fair.

TEPS score is valid to be converted into TOEFL score and this conversion is used throughout many universities in the United States.

== Test structure ==
TEPS consists of four sections: Listening Comprehension, Grammar, Vocabulary, and Reading Comprehension. The test has a total of 135 questions and takes approximately 1 hours and 45 minutes to administer. Scores are assigned on a scale of 0 points to 600 points total and incorporate Item Response Theory, which is also called the IRT.

- Listening: Parts 1 to 3 consist of conversations, while Part 4 consists of short monologues in the form of lectures, broadcasts, announcements, advertisements, and so on. Dialogues for parts 1 and 2 are heard once, because the conversation fragments are consisted with a single or three spoken statements. In these two parts, the test taker should select the answer that best comes after the fragments. Also, part 3 dialogues and part 4 lectures and their corresponding questions are heard twice before the answer choices are presented. In these two parts, the test taker should answer the question about the main idea, supporting detail, and inference about the passage. All listening comprehension questions are presented solely in aural form, which prevents lucky guesses from seeing written options prior to listening to a question. The listening section consists of 60 questions (15 for each section), lasts for about 55 minutes, and is worth 400 points.
- Grammar: The grammar section has a time constraint of 30 seconds per question, which helps measure a test taker's true ability to apply grammar knowledge in real-life situations. This comprehension section has four parts, idealized to measure both colloquial and literary abilities. The grammar section consists of 50 questions, lasts for 25 minutes, and is worth 100 points.
- Vocabulary: The TEPS vocabulary section measures a test taker's ability to use vocabulary in authentic and practical contexts. The vocabulary section incorporates many items that test knowledge of collocations in order to measure the ability to distinguish among synonyms and related words, which could be confused when translated. This comprehension section has two parts, idealized to measure both colloquial and literary abilities. The vocabulary section consists of 50 questions, lasts for 15 minutes, and is worth 100 points.
- Reading: The set of reading skills required for the TEPS reading comprehension section is identical to that required for reading tasks in everyday, academic, and work contexts. A test taker will therefore achieve good scores if they have read a diverse range of articles and trained themselves to grasp the context of an entire passage as well as sentence-level meaning. The test taker has about one minute to read each short, self-contained passage and answer a single question based on it. Because the time limit is relatively short and the passages cover a wide range of topics, it is not possible to answer the questions with rote memorization or test-wise strategies. This comprehension section contains three parts. In part one, consisted with sixteen questions, the test taker is asked to fill in the blank in the text. In part two, consisted with twenty one questions, the test taker is asked to answer three types of questions about the text, which is main idea, correct detail, and inference question. In part three, the test taker is asked to answer three texts to identify the sentence that has a detail which does not belong to the whole text. The reading section consists of 40 questions, lasts for 45 minutes, and is worth 400 points.

The new revised version of the test was introduced in May 2018, which includes four section. The listening section divided in to five parts with total 240 points and 40 minutes test time. Vocabulary and grammar section each have 60 points, with 25 minute test time and divided into further 2 and 3 parts respectively. The comprehensive reading section complete in 40 minutes and 240 points with 4 parts. The overall new test have 14 parts, 135 questions, 105 minute test duration and 0 to 600 points.

== Rating system ==
- Old TEPS 1+ Class: 901-990 points 1 Class: 801-900 points 2+ Class: 701-800 points 2 Class: 601-700 3+ Class: 501-600 points 3 Class: 401-500 4+ Class: 301-400 points 4 Class: 201-300 5+ Class: 101-200 5 Class: 10-100
- New TEPS 1+class 526 to 600 foreigners with the highest level of communication skills (Native Level of Communicative Competence) It is comparable to a well-educated native speaker to communicate and cope with professional work. Class 1 453-525 Foreigner close to the highest level of communication (Near-Native Level of Communicative Competence) If you receive intensive training for a short period of time, you will be able to communicate most of the time, and you will be able to cope with your professional work without undue difficulty. 2+ Class 387-452 Foreigner's ability to communicate at a higher level (Advanced Level of Communicative Competence) Short-term intensive training allows general field work to be carried out without much difficulty Class 2 327 to 386 Foreigner's Medium-High-Level Communication Capability (High Intermediate Level of Communicative Competence) After mid- to long-term intensive training, you can perform general field tasks without much difficulty. 3+ Grade 268 - 326 Foreigner's Medium-level Communication Capability (Mid Intermediate Level of Communicative Competence) Middle- and long-term intensive training enables a limited number of tasks to be carried out without much difficulty. 3rd grade 212-267 Foreigner's ability to communicate in the middle and lower classes (Low Intermediate Level of Communicative Competence) Middle- and long-term intensive training enables a limited number of tasks to be carried out without significant disruption. 4+ Grade 163-211 Foreigner's ability to communicate at the lower level (Novice Level of Communicative Competence) Long-term intensive training can help you accomplish tasks in a limited area without difficulty. Grade 4 111-162 points Similar to 4+ grade 5+Level 55-110: The lowest level of communication as a foreigner (Near-Zero Level of Communicative Competence) It is almost impossible to communicate with only fragmentary knowledge. 5th grade 0-54 points Similar to 5+ grade

== I-Teps ==
- Tests that play a similar role to the iBT of TOEFL. The existing TEPS has speaking and writing areas. Listening Just like the existing TEPS, all but the front door is blank. In 40 questions 80 points is perfect and the time limit is 35 minutes. Part 1 will be given 15 questions to listen to the short conversation and choose the most appropriate answer for the conversation. Part 2 will be given 15 questions to listen to a long conversation and choose the most appropriate answer to the question. In part 3, 10 questions are given to listen to the statement and choose the most appropriate answer to the question. vocabulary/words There is a perfect score of 40 for 60 questions and a time limit of 20 minutes. Part 1 contains 15 questions about selecting the most appropriate answer for the blank in the dialogue. Part 2 is given 15 questions to choose the most appropriate answer for the short space. Part 3 is given 15 questions in selecting the most appropriate vocabulary for the blank space of the dialogue. Part 4 is given 15 questions in selecting the most appropriate vocabulary for a single blank space. reading comprehension In 35 questions 80 points is perfect and the time limit is 40 minutes. Part 1 reads the fingerprint, 10 questions of selecting the most appropriate answer in the blank, and one question per fingerprint. Part 2 is a 19 question mark of the most appropriate answer to a question after reading the fingerprint and one question per question. Part 3 has six questions to read and answer questions that are most appropriate to the question, and two questions per question. Speaking The answer to 11 questions is perfect. Part 1 has three questions to answer a simple question, and the answer time is 10 seconds. Part 2 contains one question of a sound reading, 30 seconds of preparation time and 45 seconds of reply time. Part 3 will have five questions to answer in everyday conversation situations, and will be given 10 seconds to answer in 15 seconds to prepare. Part 4 is given 60 seconds of response time in 60 seconds of preparation time, with one question to be drawn and connected. Part 5 is given 120 seconds for preparation and 90 seconds for answer time, with one question for reporting and presenting the chart. Writing A perfect score of 100 is given in three paragraphs. Part 1 is given 10 minutes in dictation. Part 2 is given 15 minutes to answer e-mail, and Part 3 is given 30 minutes to write comments.

== Note ==
- Seoul National University (SNU) conducts a special TEPS test for new students every year. Subject to TEPS test scores, freshmen are qualified to take the required English courses (not approved for other tests such as TOEFL and TOEIC). The following is part of Seoul National University's undergraduate regulations related to TEPS grades," said a separate regulation applied to some departments. Bachelor's degree students are required to take one or two courses of College English 1, University English 2 or Advanced English, depending on their TEPS scores, to earn two or four credits. (Must be cultivated)

== History ==
- March 1992: English language proficiency test development launched at Seoul National University
- October 1998: Test name changed to TEPS.
- January 1999: TEPS launched.
- March 1999: TEPS adopted by the Ministry of Foreign Affairs and Trade as a selection test of Junior Professional Officers for the UN agencies.
- January 2000: TEPS online registration begun.
- September 2006: TEPS administered for the first Korean astronaut selection.
- August 2008: TEPS-Speaking & Writing launched.

== See also ==
- General Tests of English Language Proficiency (G-TELP)
- International English Language Testing System (IELTS)
- Test of English for International Communication (TOEIC)
- Test of English as a Foreign Language (TOEFL)
