= Bergenstest =

Test for Norwegian proficiency

The Bergenstest, (Norwegian: Bergenstesten lit. 'The Bergen Test') also known as Test i norsk - høyere nivå, is a test for proficiency in the Norwegian language, with variants available for both bokmål and nynorsk. It was temporarily discontinued in October 2022 and replaced by the Norwegian test. In 2024, the bankruptcy estate of Studieforbundet Folkeuniversitetet was acquired by the language school and edtech company Lingu AS, which then continued the business under a new company: Folkeuniversitetet AS. The test is now once again offered in the same format and with the same content as before.

The test is nationally approved and was a pre-requisite for non-native speakers who wish to study at a tertiary education institute (college or universities) in Norway. The test consists of a written digital exam and an oral portion which are intended to be passed by someone with an advanced grasp of the language, equivalent to a B2/C1 reference level under the Common European Framework of Reference for Languages. The test could be taken several times a year at various educational institutes around the country, and also twice a year abroad in April and October. Those who passed the test can apply to study at a Norwegian university or college for courses taught in Norwegian.
