= ECL Language tests =

Standardized EU language competency evaluations

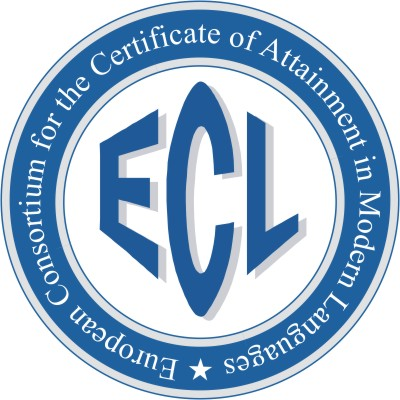
European Consortium for the Certificate of Attainment in Modern Languages

The international ECL examination system provides a standardised test-system customised to the languages of the EU member states and the EU candidate countries. The test-system is based on the recommendations of the Common European Framework of Reference (CEFR) and is operated by the European Consortium for the Certificate of Attainment in Modern Languages (ECL). The ECL is an association of institutions representing European languages.

The ECL examination system was developed by an international team of language testing experts, between 1983 and 1992. Since 1999 the International Centre of the ECL Exams operates at the Foreign Language Secretariat, at the University of Pécs, Hungary. ECL examination in Hungarian as a foreign language is a full member of ALTE (Association of Language Testers in Europe).

== General information on the ECL language exam ==
- The ECL language examination system offers monolingual tests. It is designed to test the candidates' oral and written skills in various everyday situations as well as in professional/work-related and personal/private situations.
- As part of the ECL testing four skills are tested: oral communication, listening comprehension, written communication and reading comprehension.
- The development of tests in all 15 languages is subject to strict quality standards to ensure that the various tests are reliable, valid and comparable.
- An ECL exam can be taken in the following languages: Bulgarian, Croatian, Czech, English, French, German, Hebrew, Hungarian, Italian, Spanish, Polish, Romanian, Russian, Serbian, and Slovak.

== Levels ==
The ECL language exam can be taken on four levels and it measures primarily the communicative language competences of candidates. The requirements at the different levels are adapted to the recommendations of the Common European Framework:

- A2 – Waystage
- B1 – Threshold
- B2 – Vantage
- C1 – Effective Operational Proficiency

== Examination components ==
The peculiarity of the ECL testing is that it does not include grammar tests or translation tasks. The structure of the test is the same on all four levels. The oral exam consists of two parts in which "oral communication" and "listening" skills are assessed. As part of the written part of the examination "written communication" and "reading comprehension" skills are tested. Each skill is tested by two tasks.

== Oral test ==
a / Oral communication

- The candidate must demonstrate the skill of being able to carry out an oral interaction – on given topics and in areas of interest specified for the given level – and also of being able to express their views with ease in the form of a monologue.
- Candidates are interviewed in pairs (or in groups of three if there is an odd number of candidates). The performance of the candidates is assessed by two examiners who give their assessment independently.
- The test begins with the so-called introduction, a warm-up which takes about 3–5 minutes. The main purpose of this part of the exam is to create a relaxed atmosphere and to get the candidates settled into the exam situation. This part is not assessed.
- In the first and already assessed task, which takes about 5–8 minutes, the two candidates are to have a conversation on a given topic. The examiner begins the task and provides guiding questions to facilitate the conversation between the examinees.
- In the second assessed task, which also takes 5–8 minutes, the candidates express their thoughts – in the form of a monologue – about a montage. Should it be necessary, the examiner may help the candidate in his speech with some questions.

The "Oral communication" subtest is evaluated according to the following five criteria:

a) Formal accuracy (morphology and syntax)	0–5 points
b) Oral accuracy (pronunciation, prosody, and fluency)	0–5 points
c) Vocabulary (range and fluency)	0–5 points
d) Style (pragmatic and sociolinguistic aspects)	0–5 points
e) Communicative effectiveness (task completion)	0–5 points

b / Listening comprehension

Candidates must demonstrate their ability to understand semi-authentic and authentic audio recordings that fulfil the requirements of the given level. The candidates listen to each of the two recordings twice. The listening comprehension test consists of two different types of tasks (e.g.: matching, multiple-choice questions, table filling/putting an X to where it is appropriate, sentence completion, short answers, etc.) with 10 items each.

== Written test ==
a / Written communication

Candidates must write two texts of a given length. They must adhere to the given bullet points and the given number of words. A mono- or bilingual printed dictionary may be used.

The subtest "Written communication" is evaluated according to the following five criteria:

a) Formal accuracy (morphology and syntax)	0–5 points
b) Written accuracy (text structuring and orthography)	0–5 points
c) Vocabulary (range and fluency)	0–5 points
d) Style (pragmatic and sociolinguistic aspects)	0–5 points
e) Communicative effectiveness (task completion)	0–5 points

b / Reading comprehension

Candidates must demonstrate their ability to comprehend general texts at the given exam level and their ability to solve two different types of reading comprehension tasks without using a dictionary. The reading comprehension test consists of two different types of tasks (e.g.: matching, banked gap-filling, multiple-choice questions, short answer, table filling/putting an X where it is appropriate, sentence completion, etc.) with 10 items each.

=== Test format ===
	A2	B1	B2	C1
Reading Comprehension				
Time (minutes)	35	35	45	45
Number of tasks	2	2	2	2
Number of words	400–600	500–700	800–1000	1000–1300
Correct answers	20	20	20	20
Writing comprehension				
Time (minutes)	35	40	60	75
Number of tasks	2	2	2	2
Number of words	Total 100 (ca. 50–50)	Total 200 (ca. 100–100)	Total 300 (ca. 150–150)	Total 400 (ca. 200–200)
Listening comprehension				
Time (minutes)	15–20	20–25	25–30	30–35
Number of tasks	2	2	2	2
Number of words	400–600	500–700	800–1000	1200–1500
Correct answers	20	20	20	20

== Evaluation of the tests ==
At the ECL exam, a maximum of 25 points can be given for each skill. The oral part is passed if the candidate reaches a minimum of 40% in both the skills of "oral communication" and "listening" tasks and achieves an average score of 60% overall. The written part is passed if the candidate reaches a minimum of 40% in both the skills of "written communication" and "reading comprehension" and achieves an average score of 60% overall. The complex test is successfully passed if the candidate has passed both parts of the examination as described above.

Skills score	Scores
Listening Comprehension	25 points
Oral Communication	25 points
Reading Comprehension	25 points
Written Communication	25 points

When only one of the examination parts is passed the candidate gets a certificate of the passed oral or written part exam.

Oral test	
Listening Comprehension	25 points
Oral Communication	25 points
Pass mark	30 points – 60%
Minimum number of points per skill	10 points – 40%

Written test	
Reading Comprehension	25 points
Written Communication	25 points
Pass mark	30 points – 60%
Minimum number of points per skill	10 points – 40%

== Examination locations ==
The ECL exams can be taken at approximately 200 exam sites worldwide. The exam sites are located in 18 European countries, the United States and Argentina. The exam sites network will be expanded to other countries, including Asian countries.

== Exam periods ==
ECL exams are offered five times a year. The English and German ECL exams can be taken in each of the five exam periods. Exams in the other test languages are offered twice each year.

Examination periods	Languages	Levels
February	English, German	B1, B2, C1
April	German, English, French, Hebrew, Italian, Croatian, Polish, Romanian, Russian, Serbian, Slovak and Spanish	A2, B1, B2, C1
June	English, German, Bulgarian, Czech and Hungarian	A2, B1, B2, C1
October	English, German	B1, B2, C1
December	Bulgarian, German, English, French, Hebrew, Italian, Croatian, Polish, Romanian, Russian, Serbian, Slovak, Spanish, Czech and Hungarian	A2, B1, B2, C1
