= Certamen Ciceronianum Arpinas =

The Certamen Ciceronianum Arpinas is an international Latin competition for high school seniors held in Cicero's birthplace Arpino, situated in southern Lazio, Italy. The event has been held annually since its inception in 1980.

== Organisation ==
The event, which is conducted under the tutelage of the Italian president, lasts three days, starting with the traditional commencement ceremony on the second Friday of March, and is organised by the Centro Studi Umanistici Marco Tullio Cicerone. The test takes place in the buildings of the Liceo-Ginnasio Tulliano. High school seniors studying classics from all over Europe are free to participate, provided that they pay an inscription fee (although many high schools provide waivers and several governments send students who did well in national championships free of charge).

== Course of the Certamen ==
The competition consists of a written examination encompassing two parts: a translation of a medium-sized written by Cicero from the Latin original to the participant's native language, and a stylistic and/or contextual commentary of the text (also in their native language).

During the written examination, the participant's high school teachers and accompanying staff are invited to take part in Latin seminars, conferences, concerts and city tours. The final ceremony takes place on Sunday morning at the Piazza Municipio (the municipal square) and is streamed live on Sky TG24. After the opening ceremony, ten winners are invited to the podium and awarded their prizes. The following day, the newspaper Corriere della Sera publishes the first three winners' names.

== Mission ==
Except for the promotion of the knowledge of Latin and Classical studies, the Certamen Ciceronianum Arpinas always has portrayed itself as a platform that offers young classicists from all over the world the opportunity to make contact. In 2008, e.g., 498 students from 16 different countries participated.
