= King Salman Global Academy for Arabic Language =

International language complex

- مَجْمَعُ المَلِكِ سَلْمَانَ العَالَمِيُّ لِلُّغَةِ العَرَبِيَّة
- Named after: King Salman
- Formation: September 1, 2020; 6 years ago
- Headquarters: Riyadh, Saudi Arabia
- Parent organization: Ministry of Culture
- Website: ksaa.gov.sa

King Salman Global Academy for Arabic Language (KSAA) (Arabic: مَجْمَعُ المَلِكِ سَلْمَانَ العَالَمِيُّ لِلُّغَةِ العَرَبِيَّة), initially known as the King Salman International Complex for the Arabic Language, is an international language complex based in Riyadh, Saudi Arabia, which was established for the promotion of Arabic language. Founded in September 2020 through a Council of Ministers decree, it is affiliated to the country's Ministry of Culture.

== Initiatives ==
The academy launched a project to build the Arabic Competency Test on 12 June 2022, in partnership with the Education and Training Evaluation Commission. The test is designed to measure reading, writing, listening, and speaking, aligned with the Common European Framework of Reference for Languages (CEFR).
