= STEP Eiken =

English proficiency test

- Type: Language proficiency test
- Administrator: Eiken Foundation of Japan
- Skills tested: Proficiency in English
- Year started: 1963
- Offered: 3 times yearly
- Regions: Japan
- Languages: English
- Annual number of test takers: 2.3 million
- Website: www.eiken.or.jp/eiken/en

The Eiken Test in Practical English Proficiency (実用英語技能検定, Jitsuyō Eigo Ginō Kentei), informally Eiken (英検, Eiken) and often called STEP Eiken or the STEP Test, is an English proficiency test conducted by the Eiken Foundation of Japan (formerly the Society for Testing English Proficiency), a public-interest incorporated foundation. The foundation is backed by the Ministry of Education, Culture, Sports, Science and Technology (MEXT).

== Format and contents ==
Eiken is a criterion-referenced test. There are seven levels that examinees either pass or fail. The levels are called grades (級, kyū):

Eiken level	CEFR level	MEXT benchmark
Grade 1	C1	
Grade Pre-1	B2	English teachers
Grade 2	B1	High school graduates
Grade Pre-2 Plus	A2+	High school graduates
Grade Pre-2	A2	High school graduates
Grade 3	A1	Junior high school graduates
Grade 4	A1	
Grade 5	A1	

Eiken is a four-skills test, assessing a combination of receptive and productive skills. In addition to reading, listening and speaking tests, all grades except Grades 4 and 5 include a handwritten composition task.

== Eiken in Japan ==
In Japan, Eiken is conducted three times a year: January/February, June/July, and October/November. There are two stages in the test, the first stage (vocabulary, reading, listening, and writing) and the second stage (speaking, applicants for Grades 4 or 5 are exempted). Only those who pass the first stage can progress to the second stage. The second stage is conducted about one month after the first stage. Applicants who pass both stages receive certification.

English teachers in junior high schools and high schools in Japan often encourage their students to take the Eiken. Approximately 18,000 schools serve as test sites. Japanese high schools and universities often grant preferential status to student applicants who have passed a specified Eiken grade, such as waiving the English portion of the school's entrance examination.

In its 2003 strategic initiative "Japanese with English Abilities" and 2011 follow-up "Five Proposals and Specific Measures for Developing Proficiency in English for International Communication" (国際共通語としての英語力向上のための５つの提言と具体的対策), MEXT designated Eiken Grade 3 as a benchmark proficiency level for junior high school graduates, Grades 2 and Pre-2 for high school graduates, and Grade Pre-1 for English teachers.

In fiscal 2010, examinees for all Eiken grades totaled approximately 2.3 million. According to the Eiken website, the test has been taken by over 100 million applicants since its inception in 1963.

== Eiken outside Japan ==
A number of schools outside Japan use Eiken as an admission qualification for international students. In Canada and the United States, approximately 400 colleges and universities recognize Eiken Grade 2, Grade 2A, Grade Pre-1, and/or Grade 1 for incoming students, as of 2021. In Australia, the state of New South Wales recognizes Eiken at all Technical and Further Education (TAFE) institutes and all state high schools. The test is also used at institutions in Queensland, Tasmania, Victoria, and Western Australia.

In 2009, The Korea Times quoted Ahn Byong-man, Minister of Education, Science and Technology, announcing that South Korea's new national English test being developed by the ministry is based on the Eiken.

== Research ==
The Eiken Foundation offers grants for independent research projects conducted by educators. Grants are not limited to research on the Eiken tests or testing in general, and are available for a variety of projects that examine aspects of language education and suggestions for improving English education in Japan. Reports on these projects are published in the journal Eiken Bulletin.

In 2003, work was begun on the Eiken Can-do List. The finished list, published in 2006, is based on a survey of 20,000 Eiken certificate holders and is designed to investigate what "test takers believe they can accomplish in English in real-life language use situations." More recent projects include an evaluation of the Eiken testing program carried out by international testing specialist James D. Brown and a number of criterion-referenced validity studies investigating the relationship between the Eiken grades and other criterion measures of English ability.
