= The European Language Certificates =

International standardised tests of ten languages

The European Language Certificates (telc; also known as telc language tests) are international standardised tests of ten languages.

telc gGmbH is a non-profit language test, examination and certificate provider based in Frankfurt am Main. A subsidiary of the German Adult Education Association (DVV), it is the primary examination provider around the world for standardized telc language tests. telc gGmbH offers more than 70 different telc certificates, including general language and vocational examinations and tests for students. All telc language tests correspond to the Common European Framework of Reference for Languages (CEFR), which was published in 2001 by the Council of Europe, to cover the skills of listening, reading, speaking and writing.

telc language tests can be taken in English, German, Turkish, Spanish, French, Italian, Portuguese, Russian, Polish, and Arabic at 3,000 test centers in 20 countries, including community colleges and private language schools.

telc gGmbH is a full member of the Association of Language Testers in Europe (ALTE).

== History ==
The European Language Certificates – today telc language tests, formerly VHS Certificate – arose in 1968 when a team of language experts led by Robert Nowacek first developed as a standardized language test for the German Adult Education Association (DVV) – the VHS Certificate in English. Over the years, tests followed in other European languages.In 1995 the Examination Centre of DVV became a member of the Association of Language Testers in Europe (ALTE). The main objective of this association of Language Testers from over 20 European countries is the quality assurance of language exams. In 1998 the examination Centre of DVV became WBT (Weiterbildungs-Testsysteme gGmbH), eight years later it was renamed telc gGmbH (with the stylized 'telc').

== German test for Immigrants / German test for Austria ==
On behalf of the Federal Ministry of the Interior, telc gGmbH in cooperation with Goethe-Institute developed the German test for immigrants (DTZ) from 2006 to 2009. The test is taken to complete the Integrationskurs and the result, if successful, entails a settlement permit in Germany. Also, naturalization may be requested with proof of the successful completion of the German test for immigrants. After the development, telc gGmbH received the commission by the Federal Office for Migration and Refugees to carry out and further develop the DTZ. In 2011, telc gGmbH developed the German Test for Austria on behalf of the Austrian Integration Fund (ÖIF), which was founded by the Austrian Federal Ministry of the Interior (BMI). It is a version of the German test for immigrants A2-B1, revised for Austria. Since 1 July 2011, the proof of German language skills at level B1 of the Common European Framework of Reference is required also in Austria for obtaining citizenship.

== Recognition ==
In Germany telc gGmbH partners with the federal government for the language examination at the end of the Integrationskurs (integration course) for immigrants. Individuals who wish to apply for German citizenship can document the necessary language skills with a telc certificate. When it comes to residence permits, all German-speaking countries recognize telc certificates. In the context of subsequent immigration of a spouse to Germany, the Ministry of Foreign Affairs recognises the exam "Start German 1 / telc German A1" as a requirement for a visa concerning the subsequent immigration of a spouse. In Poland, telc certificates are recognised as proof of language proficiency for a career in the civil service. In Hungary, the government-accredited telc examinations are a requirement for higher education qualifications. In Switzerland, depending on the canton, the required language skills for naturalization or acquisition into the Public Service can be proven with telc certificates.

Also, the Turkish Higher Education Council (YÖK) officially recognize the German telc language tests. The recognition by the supreme state control committee of Turkish universities is valid for all German exams by telc gGmbH on the competency levels B2, B2 +, and C1 of the Common European Framework of Europe. In the course of this recognition, the tests were incorporated into the official equivalence table (İngilizce Dil Esdegerligi tablosu) of the University Council. Thus telc language tests can be used and recognized by all Turkish universities and institutions of higher education and employed for the recruitment of lecturers, for students who wish to study a master's degree and doctoral candidates who must demonstrate their language skills.

Universities in Spain recognise telc certificates as proof of foreign language skills. The certificate telc Deutsch C1 Hochschule is officially recognised and accepted by the members of the German Rectors' and Cultural Ministers’ Conference as proof of language skills for admission to German universities. Also, many universities in Austria and Switzerland accept telc Certificates. Germany, in particular, makes use of the telc language certificates for physicians and nursing staff in the context of professional recognition. telc English C1 certificates are used in Germany for proof of language skills for primary school teachers. The telc entrance examination provides access to university studies for qualified candidates.

== Exam Implementation ==
TELC language tests can be taken worldwide at more than 3,000 testing centres, including adult education centres and private language schools. Exam dates can be set independently by each examination centre as well as the examination prices can vary from the test centre to test centre. Test results are available after four to six weeks. TELC certificates are valid for an unlimited period.

== telc characteristics ==
telc language tests incorporate the following features:

- telc examinations test the ability to listen, read, write and speak in ten languages.
- telc examinations are geared to the Common European Framework of Reference for Languages: Learning, teaching and assessment.
- In Germany the telc gGmbH is the exclusive partner of the federal government for the language test taken at the end of the Integrationskurs for migrants.
- In Germany telc certificates are recognized as the official proof of German language competence in order to receive citizenship.
- In Poland the telc certificate is recognized as the proof of language competence for civil service applicants.
- In Hungary students must prove language competence at B2 level in order to obtain their university degree. telc language tests are state-approved in Hungary.
- In Switzerland telc certificates are accepted as pre-requisites to obtain Swiss citizenship.

== TELC structure ==
All candidates must complete four modules (reading, writing, listening and speaking) to obtain a score.

=== Written Examination ===
==== Reading Comprehension ====
The Reading Comprehension covers three types of tasks: reading for gist, reading for detail, and selective reading.

==== Language elements ====
The Language Elements part covers two tasks. In the first task, the candidates are required to accomplish a multiple-choice test choosing from three different alternatives. In the second task, the candidates are required to complete a text with ten words choosing from 15 words. The Language Elements tests grammatical accuracy and vocabulary as well.

==== Listening ====
The listening task comprises three types of tasks: Listening for gist, listening for detail, and selective listening.

==== Writing ====
The writing task consists of only one part. The candidate can choose from two situations and has to write a formal letter (letter of application, letter of complaint or letter of inquiry).

=== Oral Examination ===
Each oral examination for telc English (B2) normally takes place with two candidates. For each examination, there are two examiners. In exceptional cases, e.g. when there is an odd number of candidates at the examination centre, the candidates may be tested in three. The examination is intended to have the character of a conversation, not an interrogation. The main task of the examiners is to supervise the conversation. They are instructed to say as little as possible. For the purpose of the examination, it is more important for the candidate to have an active conversation with his/her partner. The candidate should respond to what his/her partner says without trying to dominate the conversation. Both candidates are expected to involve themselves in the conversation so as to produce an interesting dialogue on a variety of topics. It will have a positive effect on the candidate's mark if he/she tries to help his/her partner, should he/she at any time have problems trying to express what he/she would like to say. The oral examination lasts about 15 minutes with two candidates, 25 minutes with three candidates. Before the examination starts, the candidate has twenty minutes to prepare for the examination with the help of candidate sheets giving details of the tasks the candidate will have to complete. During this preparation time, the candidate is not allowed to communicate with his/her partner.

==== Presentation ====
In this part of the examination, the candidates should present something briefly to their partner. They can choose from two topics. The presentation should not be longer than 90 seconds. It should only be interrupted if something is really not understood. After the presentation, the candidate has to answer the questions his/her partner asks. The same procedure applies to all candidates: presentation, questions and answers.

==== Discussion ====
In this part of the examination, the candidates will have a discussion on a controversial topic. First, the candidates should say something about the text they have read during the preparation. The candidates have to present the arguments or points they think are interesting. In the discussion which follows, they will be expected to give their own opinion on the topic concerned. They have to make sure they have a discussion in which they express their points of view, they have to exchange arguments and respond to what their partner says.

==== Task ====
In this part of the examination, the candidates will be given a task to carry out. The candidates will be given only the situation and will have to think of the details themselves. The candidates should think about all the points they wish to make, express their opinions, make suggestions and respond to what their partner says.

=== Duration ===
Sub-Test	Duration
Reading Comprehension and Language Elements	90 minutes
Writing	30 minutes
Listening	25–30 minutes
Speaking	15–20 minutes

== Points ==
Sub-Test	Maximum Number of Points
WRITTEN EXAMINATION	225
Reading Comprehension	75
Part 1	25
Part 2	25
Part 3	25
Language Elements	30
Part 1	15
Part 2	15
Listening Comprehension	75
Part 1	25
Part 2	25
Part 3	25
Writing	45
ORAL EXAMINATION	75
Presentation	25
Discussion	25
Task	25
TOTAL POINTS	300

== Languages ==
Language exams offered by telc gGmbH are as per below:

Language	CEFR levels					
Language	A1	A2	B1	B2	C1	C2
Arabic	-	-	B1	-	-	-
English	A1	A2	B1	B2	C1	C2
French	A1	A2	B1	B2	-	-
German	A1	A2	B1	B2	C1	C2
Italian	A1	A2	B1	B2	-	-
Polish	-	-	B1	B2	-	-
Portuguese	-	-	B1	-	-	-
Russian	A1	A2	B1	B2	-	-
Spanish	A1	A2	B1	B2	-	-
Turkish	A1	A2	B1	B2	C1	-
Ukrainian	-	-	-	B2	-	-

=== Arabic ===
For Arabic, telc gGmbH offers exams at B1 CEFR level for learners with basic skills who can already communicate fairly well in everyday situations.

=== English ===
For English, telc gGmbH offers exams at all CEFR levels. In addition, at A2, A2-B1, B1 and B2 CEFR levels candidates can take a 'School' exam which is specially designed for pupils aged about 12 to 16. At A2-B2, B1, B1-B2, B2 and B2-C1 CEFR levels candidates can take 'Business' exams which are designed especially for learners who wish to prove their language competence in various everyday business situations. At B1 CEFR level, candidates can take a 'Hotel and restaurant' exam which is designed for learners who wish to prove their language competence in the hotel and restaurant fields. At B2 CEFR level candidates can take a 'Technical' exam which is designed for advanced learners in technical professions.

=== French ===
For French, telc gGmbH offers four levels (A1, A2, B1 and B2). In addition, at A2 CEFR level candidates can choose from TELC Français A2 (for learners after completing an average of 250 – 300 teaching units) or TELC Français A2 Ecole which is designed for school pupils aged about 12 to 16 (in classes 7 to 10). At B1 level TELC Français B1 there are two options for learners with basic skills who can already communicate fairly well in everyday situations or TELC Français B1 Ecole which is designed for school pupils aged about 14 to 17 (in classes 9 to 11).

=== German ===
For German, telc gGmbH tests for German can be taken at six different CEFR levels (A1, A2, B1, B2, C1 and C2). In Hungary, the TELC certificate in the German language is accredited.

=== Italian ===
For Italian, telc gGmbH offers CEFR language exams at four levels (A1, A2, B1, and B2).

=== Portuguese ===
For Portuguese, telc gGmbH offers language exam at B1 level.

=== Russian ===
For Russian, TELC language tests can be taken at four different levels (A1, A2, B1 and B2).

=== Spanish ===
For Spanish, telc gGmbH offers exams at four CEFR levels (A1, A2, B1 and B2). At A2 level candidates can choose from TELC Español A2 (for learners after completing an average of 250 – 300 teaching units) or TELC Español A2 Escuela which is designed for school pupils aged about 12 to 16 (in classes 7 to 10). At B1 level there are two options i.e. TELC Español B1 (for learners with basic skills who can already communicate fairly well in everyday situations) or TELC Español B1 Escuela which is designed for school pupils aged about 14 to 17 (in classes 9 to 11). At B2 level candidates can take TELC Español B2 (for advanced learners who can clearly and explicitly express themselves) or TELC Español B2 Escuela which is designed for advanced school pupils aged about 17 to 19 (in classes 12 to 13).

=== Turkish ===
For Turkish, telc gGmbH offers exams at five different levels (A1, A2, B1, B2 and C1). In addition, at A2 CEFR level candidates can choose from TELC Türkçe A2 which is designed for learners after completing an average of 250 – 300 teaching units or TELC Türkçe A2 Okul which is designed for school pupils who can communicate simply in everyday situations. At B1 level candidates can choose from TELC Türkçe B1 (for learners with basic skills who can already communicate fairly well in everyday situations) or from TELC Türkçe B1 Okul which is designed for school pupils aged about 12 to 15 (classes 7 to 10). At B2 level there are two options i.e. TELC Türkçe B2 (for advanced learners who can clearly and explicitly express themselves) or TELC Türkçe B2 Okul which is designed for more advanced school pupils aged about 15 to 19 (in classes 10 to 13).

=== Ukrainian ===
For Ukrainian, telc gGmbH offers language exam at B2 level.

== TELC centres ==
=== Hungary ===
On 13 October 2018, the Budapest-based Tudományos Ismeretterjesztő Társulat announced the cessation of their partnership with TELC. The last exam would be held in February 2019. However, it was also announced that the TELC will continue its operation in Hungary.

== telc Book Map Error ==
In 2017, the Federal Office for Migration and Refugees withdrew approval for a German textbook published by telc gGmbH for showing Crimea as part of Russia. In the series "Einfach gut! Deutsch für die Integration" by telc gGmbH, a map with the "Russian" Crimea was printed in textbooks for levels B 1.1 and B1.2. telc gGmbH commented that the company regretted "the reprint of the faulty map" with the note that it did not mean to make "a political statement".

== See also ==
- Common European Framework of Reference for Languages
- Language assessment
- List of language proficiency tests
