= Pearson language tests =

English language assessments for non-native speakers

Pearson PLC offers various international standardized tests of English language proficiency for non-native English language speakers. The tests include the Pearson Test of English Academic (PTE Academic), Pearson English International Certificate (PEIC) (formerly known as PTE General and London Tests of English (LTE)), and Pearson English International Certificate Young Learners (PEIC YL). These are scenario-based exams, accredited by the QCA and Ofqual, and are administered in association with Edexcel.

== Pearson Test of English Academic ==
The Pearson Test of English Academic assesses the ability of non-native English speakers to participate in a university-level English language instruction program. It is a computer-based exam that focuses on real-life English used in academic surroundings. The test takers listen to a variety of accents and academic language that they will encounter at English-speaking higher education institutions.

The exam includes an unmarked voice recording of the candidate, which is part of advanced biometric data that should assist institutions in verifying the identity of candidates and should aid them with their admission decisions. The test is a maximum of 2 hours and 15 minutes long, and takers can expect their results to be delivered to them online within 5 working days.

Test scores are reported on the Global Scale of English, a standardised, numeric scale from 10 to 90 that measures English language proficiency more precisely with reference to the widely known set of levels in the Common European Framework of Reference for Languages.

The Pearson Test of English Academic has sections:

Section	Duration	Content
Speaking and writing	54 – 67 minutes	Personal introduction (not scored); Read aloud; Repeat sentence; Describe image; Re-tell lecture; Answer short question; Respond to a Situation; Summarize Group Discussion; Summarise written text (10 mins); Essay (20 mins)
Reading	29 – 30 minutes	Reading and writing: fill in the blanks; Multiple choice: choose multiple answers; Re-order paragraphs; Multiple choice: choose a single answer; Fill in the blanks
Listening	30 – 50 minutes	Summarise spoken text (10 mins); Multiple choice: choose multiple answers; Fill in the blanks; Highlight the correct summary; Multiple choice: choose a single answer; Select missing word; Highlight incorrect words; Write from dictation

== Pearson English International Certificate (PEIC) ==
PEIC (formerly known as PTE General and before then the London Test of English) was developed by Pearson Language Tests, administered by Edexcel, and accredited by QCA.

In some countries (e.g. Poland, Greece) the oral interview is assessed by locally trained assessors, whereas in other countries (e.g. France, Italy, Argentina, United Arab Emirates) they are entirely graded in London.

There are six levels which are mapped to the Common European Framework of Reference for Languages.

CEFR level	PEIC	Exam time
C2 Proficient (Mastery)	Level 5	2h55
C1 Advanced (Operational Proficiency)	Level 4	2h30
B2 Upper Intermediate	Level 3	2h
B1 Intermediate	Level 2	1h35
A2 Elementary	Level 1	1h30
A1 Foundation	Level A1	1h15

== Pearson English International Certificate Young Learners (PEIC YL) ==
Pearson English International Certificate Young Learners (formerly known as PTE Young leaners and before that LTEfC) is an English language exams for young children (aged from 7 to 12) who learning English as a foreign language. They test the four skills: reading, writing, listening and speaking.

PEIC YL exams are based around the adventures of the Brown family. The exams are theme based and designed to be fun and motivating. At the lower levels they aim to test how well children can use language structures and at the higher levels how well they can use language to complete communicative tasks. For this reason, the tests use real-life scenarios rather than grammatical exercises.

The PEIC YL was originally developed by the University of London Schools Examination Board in 1982. The Examination Board merged with Business & Technological Council (BTEC) in 1996 to become Edexcel.

There are four PEIC YL levels:

Level	PEIC YL	Exam time
1	Firstwords	1h
2	Springboard	1h
3	Quickmarch	1h
4	Breakthrough	1h15
