= Oxford Test of English =

English proficiency tests developed by Oxford University Press

- Acronym: OTE
- Type: Standardised test
- Administrator: Oxford University Press
- Skills tested: Speaking, Listening, Reading and Writing of the English language
- Purpose: To assess the English language proficiency of non‑native speakers
- Year started: 2017; 9 years ago
- Duration: Speaking: ~15 minutes; Listening: ~30 minutes; Reading: ~35 minutes; Writing: ~45 minutes; Total: ~2 hours
- Score range: 0–140 (OTE, OTE for Schools); 0–170 (OTE Advanced)
- Score validity: Scores valid for life
- Offered: On demand at approved test centres
- Regions: Global
- Languages: English
- Website: elt.oup.com/feature/global/oxford-test-of-english/

Oxford Test of English is a suite of computer‑based English proficiency tests developed by Oxford University Press and certified by the University of Oxford. It assesses four skills—Speaking, Listening, Reading and Writing—and reports results aligned to the CEFR at A2–B2 (OTE and OTE for Schools) and B2–C1 (OTE Advanced). Tests are delivered on demand via approved centres worldwide, with Reading and Listening scored immediately and Speaking and Writing typically reported within five working days.

== History ==
Development of the Oxford Test of English (OTE) began in the mid‑2010s, with Spain selected for the first national launch in April 2017. The global rollout followed in April 2019 and was marked at the 53rd IATEFL Conference in Liverpool, including a launch event at Tate Liverpool.

In 2020, the Oxford test of English was shortlisted for “Best Use of Summative Assessment” at the International e‑Assessment Awards. That same year, Oxford Test of English for Schools (OTEfS)was launched, a variant of OTE specifically targeting 12–16-year-olds.

In 2024, Oxford University Press launched Oxford Test of English Advanced (OTEA) to target higher‑level certification at B2–C1 for academic and professional use, with recognition including admissions at the University of Oxford. In June 2025, OTE Advanced received the **Best Summative Assessment Project** award at the International e‑Assessment Awards, celebrating its innovative use of technology and real-world relevance in assessment delivery.

== Format ==
=== Modules and delivery ===
The suite comprises four modules—Speaking, Listening, Reading and Writing which can be taken individually or in any combination. Module durations are ~15 minutes (Speaking), ~30 (Listening), ~35 (Reading) and ~45 (Writing) with whole‑test time around two hours.

Listening and Reading are computer‑adaptive: an algorithm selects subsequent items based on previous responses, improving efficiency and measurement precision. Speaking and Writing are randomised linear tests marked by trained human assessors against published criteria.

=== Marking and quality assurance ===
Productive skills are marked by trained assessors, supported by standardisation and ongoing quality control processes described in the test specifications.

== Scoring and results ==
For OTE and OTE for Schools, module and overall results are reported on a 0–140 standardised scale mapped to CEFR bands (A2: 51–80; B1: 81–110; B2: 111–140). Certificates may show different CEFR levels across modules, reflecting test‑taker performance; scores are valid for life. Reading and Listening results are available immediately, with Speaking and Writing typically reported within five working days.

For OTE Advanced, results are reported on a 0–170 scale with certification at B2 (111 - 140) and C1 (141-170); candidates below B2 receive an indicative “Below B2”.

== Variants ==
=== Oxford Test of English (OTE) ===
Introduced in 2017, Oxford Test of English is an online four-skill English proficiency test taken in secure test centres around the world as evidence of English proficiency at CEFR A2, B1, and B2 levels for gaining entry to education and employment.

=== Oxford Test of English for Schools (OTEfS) ===
Introduced in 2020, Oxford Test of English for Schools uses the same format and scoring as OTE but adapts topics and tasks for test‑takers aged 12–16 (e.g., more age‑appropriate content and informal responses in certain Speaking tasks).

=== Oxford Test of English Advanced (OTEA) ===
Launched in 2024, OTE Advanced targets higher‑level proficiency for university entry and professional contexts at CEFR B2–C1. Test specifications emphasise integrated skills and mediation (e.g., spoken summary of multiple audio inputs; written summary of multiple textual inputs). Recognition includes use for University of Oxford admissions.

== Administration, security and accessibility ==
All tests are delivered in invigilated sessions at approved centres, using secure browser technology; results can be verified online by organisations. Accessibility measures and accommodations are described in the test specifications.

== Recognition ==
OTE is recognised by a range of universities, organisations and public bodies internationally. In Spain, recognition includes multiple ministries, regional authorities and universities; Andalusian public universities list OTE among accepted certificates for CEFR equivalence.

== See also ==
- Common European Framework of Reference for Languages
- Language proficiency
