= TOEIC =

International standardized test

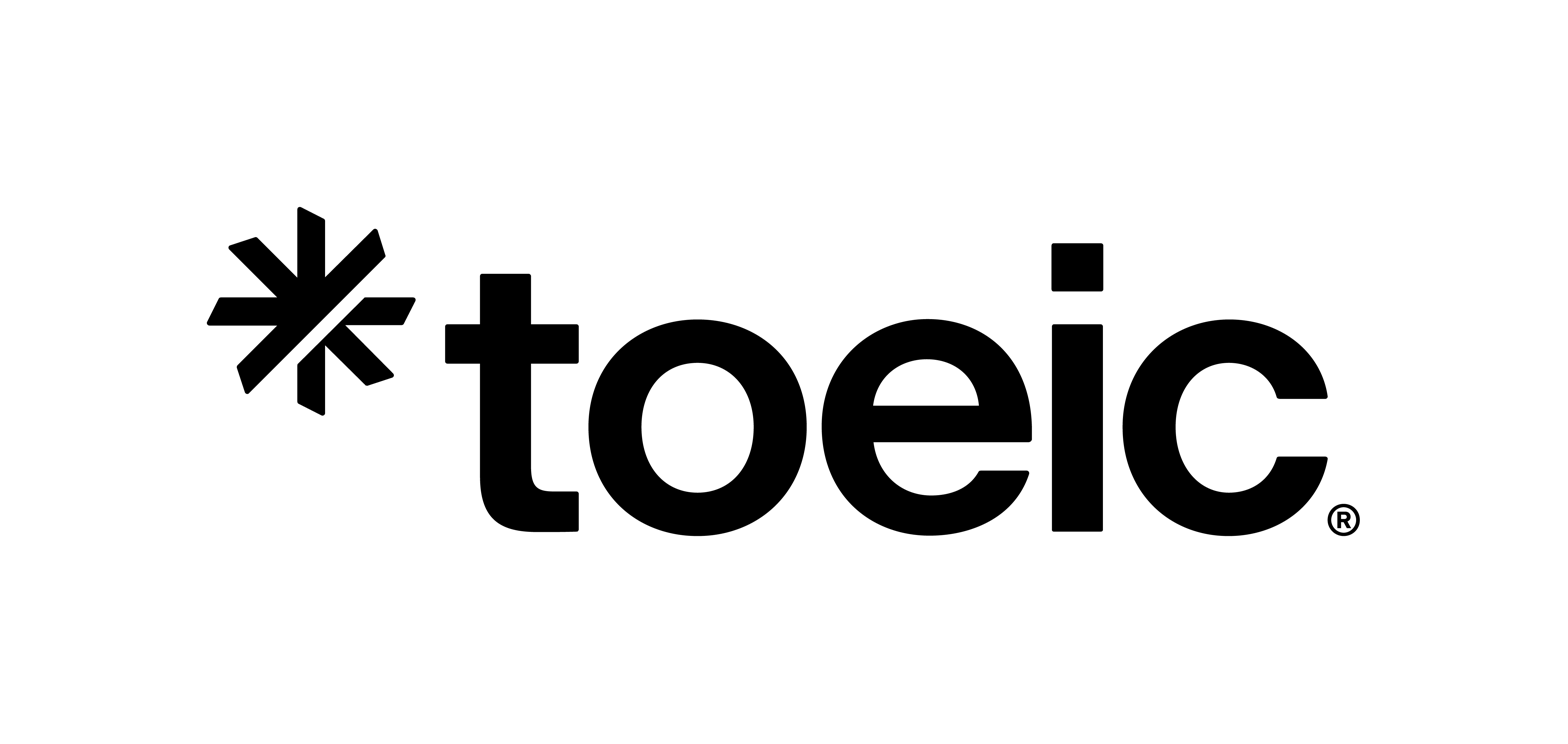
- Administrator: Educational Testing Service
- Website: www.ets.org/toeic.html

The Test of English for International Communication (TOEIC) is an international standardized test of English language proficiency for non-native speakers. It is designed to measure the everyday English skills of people working in an international environment.

There are different forms of the exam: the TOEIC Listening & Reading Test consists of two equally graded tests of comprehension assessment activities totaling a possible 990 score; there are also the TOEIC Speaking and Writing tests. The TOEIC Speaking test is composed of tasks that assess pronunciation, intonation and stress, vocabulary, grammar, cohesion, relevance of content, and completeness of content. The TOEIC Writing test is composed of tasks that assess grammar, relevance of sentences to the pictures, quality and variety of sentences, vocabulary, organization, and whether opinions are supported with reason and/or examples. Both the Speaking and Writing assessments use a score scale of 0–200.

== History ==
The basic idea of the TOEIC test was conceived by Yasuo Kitaoka (北岡靖男, Kitaoka Yasuo), a retired Time staff member who noticed a lack of English communication ability among the Japanese population.

He proposed the idea to the US-based Educational Testing Service (ETS), but the organization rejected him since they preferred to collaborate with nonprofit organizations. He also failed to convince the Ministry of Education, Culture, Sports, Science and Technology, who had already launched STEP Eiken. Instead, Kitaoka found his close friend Yaeji Watanabe (渡辺弥栄司, Watanabe Yaeji), a retired official from the Ministry of International Trade and Industry, to support him.

Kitaoka and Watanabe established World Economic Information Services (財団法人世界経済情報サービス) (WEIS), thus enabling Kitaoka to collaborate with ETS. WEIS later established a committee to develop TOEIC. The first TOEIC test was launched in 1979 and taken by 3,000 individuals.

In 1986, a newly created organization, the Institute for International Business Communication (財団法人国際ビジネスコミュニケーション協会, Zaidanhōjin Kokusai Bijinesu Komyunikēshon Kyōkai) (IIBC), took over the administration of the TOEIC from WEIS. In 2006, ETS released a new version of the TOEIC test.

ETS's major competitors are the University of Cambridge, which administers the IELTS, FCE, CAE, and CPE, and Trinity College London, which administers the GESE and ISE exams.

== Formats and content ==
=== TOEIC Listening & Reading Test ===
The TOEIC Listening & Reading Test lasts two hours; 45 minutes for Listening, and 75 minutes for Reading. It consists of 200 multiple-choice items evenly divided between the listening and reading comprehension section. Each question is worth five points. Each candidate receives independent scores for listening and reading comprehension on a scale from 0 to 495 points. The total score adds up to a scale from 0 to 990 points. The TOEIC certificate exists in five colors, corresponding to the results achieved:

- orange (0–219)
- brown (220–469)
- green (470–729)
- blue (730–859)
- gold (860–990)

TOEIC test certificates are optional, unofficial documents that are meant for display only.

==== 2006 redesigned TOEIC tests ====
A new version of the TOEIC Listening & Reading test was released in 2006. The changes can be summarized as follows:

- Overall, passages are longer.
- Part 1 has fewer questions involving photograph descriptions.
- The Listening Section hires speakers of English from Britain, Australia, New Zealand and North America, and uses an equal distribution of the dialects. However, all the voice actors for the audio sections have lived in the United States for an extended period.
- Part 6 no longer contains an error-spotting task, criticized as unrealistic in a corporate environment, instead adopting the use of a task wherein the test taker fills in blanks in incomplete sentences.
- Part 7 contains not only single-passage questions, but also double- and triple-passage questions wherein the test taker reads and compares two or three related passages, such as an e-mail correspondence.

According to a survey conducted in 2006 by the Institute for International Business Communication (財団法人 国際ビジネスコミュニケーション協会, Zaidanhōjin Kokusai Bijinesu Komyunikēshon Kyōkai), 56.8% of the respondents who took both the older and the revised versions of the TOEIC test in Japan find the latter version more difficult. The lower the score the test taker achieves, the more marked this tendency becomes. As many as 85.6% of those who earned scores ranging from 0 to 395 points find the revised TOEIC test more difficult, while 69.9% of those who earned 400 to 495 points think this way, as do 59.3% of those who earned 500 to 595 points. Among those who achieved 600 to 695 points, 58.9% agreed with these findings; 48.6% of those who scored 700 to 795 points agreed; 47.9% of those who scored 800 to 895 points agreed; and 39.8% of those who scored 900 to 990 points agreed.

2006 also saw the addition of TOEIC Speaking & Writing tests. In 2007 there were additional changes to the TOEIC Reading & Listening test that decreased emphasis on knowledge of grammatical rules.

===== Test scores in redesigned TOEIC =====
Scores on the TOEIC Listening and Reading test are determined by the number of correct answers. The number of correct responses on each section is multiplied by five and converted to a scaled score. Three TOEIC Listening and Reading scaled scores are given for each examinee:

- οne for the Listening Section
- οne for the Reading Section
- οne Total Score that consists of the sum of the Listening Section and Reading Section sub-scores.

Each sub-score can range from 0 to 495 points. The Total Score ranges from 0 to 990. There is no negative scoring. The Total Score consists of the sum of the Listening Section and Reading Section sub-scores.

==== 2016 updated TOEIC L&R tests ====
In 2016, a new version of the TOEIC test was released in Japan and South Korea, including new types of questions. The updated TOEIC test became available worldwide in 2018.

Some of the changes to the test are as follows:

Listening:

- Number of photograph and question response questions decreased, number of conversation questions increased instead
- 3 or more speakers in some conversations
- Shorter turns and more exchanges in some conversations
- Colloquial phrases (e.g., "gonna") and incomplete sentences/fragments (e.g., "Yes, in a minute") in conversations
- New question types include:
  - Identifying information using a graphic (a table, graph, etc.)
  - Understanding the implied meaning of speakers within a conversation

Reading:

- Number of incomplete sentence filling questions decreased
- Addition of long text completion (fill-in-the-blank) questions
- New question type to test the understanding of three related passages
- Text messages, instant messages, or online chat conversations with multiple speakers

Despite these changes, the update to the test came with no change to score scale, test difficulty, number of items, or test length, according to ETS.

=== TOEIC Speaking & Writing Test ===
The TOEIC Speaking & Writing Tests were introduced in 2006. Test takers receive separate scores for each of the two tests, or they can take the Speaking test without taking the Writing test and vice versa. The Speaking test assesses pronunciation, intonation and stress, vocabulary, grammar, cohesion, relevance of content, and completeness of content; while the Writing test assesses grammar, relevance of sentences to the pictures, quality and variety of sentences, vocabulary, organization, and whether the opinion is supported with reason and/or examples. The tests are designed to reflect actual English usage in the workplace, though they do not require any knowledge of specialized business terms. The TOEIC Speaking Test takes approximately 20 minutes to complete; the TOEIC Writing Test lasts approximately 60 minutes. Each test has a score range between 0–200, with test takers grouped into eight proficiency levels for Speaking and nine proficiency levels for Writing.

=== Test accommodations ===
Below are the types of accommodations commonly given:

- extended testing time
- additional rest breaks
- reader
- scribe
- recorder to mark answers
- headphones
- alternate test formats, e.g. Braille, enlarged print
- alternate response formats, e.g. computer for writing section
- wheelchair access

=== TOEIC Bridge Test ===
ETS also administers another version of the TOEIC test called the TOEIC Bridge. The TOEIC Bridge test targets beginning and intermediate learners and consists of 100 multiple-choice questions, requiring about one hour of testing time.

== By country ==
=== Chile ===
The TOEIC Bridge was used in Chile as part of the 2010 SIMCE test.

=== Europe ===
In France, some grandes écoles require a TOEIC score of at least 785 for a diploma. This policy has been criticized, as it makes state-awarded diplomas dependent on a private institution, despite the fact that it was not the private institution that set the 785 mark but a recommendation from the Commission des titres d'ingénieur indicating a B2+ level on the Common European Framework of Reference for Languages. Students who fail to achieve a 785 score may validate their diplomas by other means in most schools. Some institutions delay awarding diplomas for one year after the end of studies in such cases.

In Greece, the TOEIC is accepted by ASEP, the organization responsible for hiring new employees to work for the government. It is administered by the Hellenic American Union and offered weekly in most major cities in Greece.

=== Japan ===
The Institute for International Business Communication (財団法人国際ビジネスコミュニケーション協会, Zaidanhōjin Kokusai Bijinesu Komyunikēshon Kyōkai) administers the TOEIC test in Japan, where nearly 2.4 million people (as of 2014) take the test; 1.3M for institutional program (IP) and 1.1M for secure program (SP).

There are two ways to take the TOEIC test. One is called the TOEIC SP Test (Secure Program Test; 公開テスト, Kōkai Tesuto), in which one can take the test individually or in a group on specified dates at a test center specified by the TOEIC Steering Committee. The other is the TOEIC Institutional Program (IP) Test (団体特別受験制度, Dantai Tokubetsu Juken Seido), in which an organization can choose the date and administer the test at its convenience in accordance with the TOEIC Steering Committee. The TOEIC SP Test was renewed in May 2006, followed by the TOEIC IP Test in April 2007 in line so that it would be with the SP Test.

More and more companies use TOEIC scores for personnel assessment instead of the homegrown STEP Eiken test organized by the Society for Testing English Proficiency (STEP) (日本英語検定協会主催実用英語技能検定試験「英検」, Nihon Eigo Kentei Kyōkai Shusai Jitsuyō Eigo Ginō Kentei Shiken "Eiken"). The TOEIC Speaking Test/Writing Test started on January 21, 2007, in addition to the TOEIC SP Test and the TOEIC IP Test.

==== Scandal ====
The Institute for International Business Communication (IIBC), the non-profit organization that administers the TOEIC in Japan, was the subject of a scandal in 2009.

In May and June 2009, articles in the Japanese weekly magazine FRIDAY accused the IIBC's 92-year-old chairman Yaeji Watanabe of nepotism when he appointed his girlfriend's son to the position of chairman of the IIBC board of directors. To force the appointment, half of the volunteers serving on the board were driven out by Watanabe. The magazine article also questioned why Watanabe only showed up for work about one day a week.

In his defense, Watanabe claimed that he held a ceremonial title and was chairman in name only. As a result, Watanabe claimed that he had little to do with the decision to appoint his girlfriend's son to the position. The magazine article concluded by asking why someone who is chairman in name only and works only one day a week should receive an annual salary in excess of 25 million yen (approximately US$300,000).

In August 2009, the online version of the English-language newspaper The Japan Times published a two-part series examining the TOEIC's origins and early history as well as the use of test-taker fees by the IIBC on the internet. The August 18 article examined the questionable uses of test fees, including a fivefold increase in utility expenses in one year, 13 million spent annually on research about adapting to Chinese culture, sponsorship of poetry readings by the Chinese Poetry Recitation Association, and membership fees to join the Beautiful Aging Association, for which Watanabe happened to be chairman.

The article also questioned the relationship between the IIBC and its for-profit partner International Communications School with which it shared office space. International Communications School is responsible for selling the TOEIC Institutional Program Test given by companies and schools; publishes IIBC-approved TOEIC preparation textbooks; and administers the TOEIC Japanese language website. One of International Communications School's subsidiaries is E-Communications, which administers the TOEIC's online application system and provides online TOEIC study materials.

In 2009, Watanabe suddenly resigned from the IIBC, leaving his girlfriend's son in charge of the non-profit. Watanabe received a 25 million yen retirement payment.

The IIBC lowered the price of the TOEIC Secure Program Test from 6,615 yen to 5,985 yen starting with the September 13, 2009 test. The price had to be lowered due to pressure from the Ministry of Trade, which instructed the IIBC to reduce the profits being generated by the test.

In July 2010, the Tokyo Tax Bureau announced that International Communications School, IIBC's for-profit partner, hid 100 million yen in income and had to pay 30 million yen in back taxes and fines.

=== South Korea ===
Historically, the International Communication Foundation (Korean: 국제교류진흥회), a subsidiary of the language education company YBM Sisa (currently YBM Inc.), administered TOEIC tests in Korea from 1982 to 2006. Its role as administrator was transferred to the Korea TOEIC Committee (Korean: 한국TOEIC위원회), another YBM subsidiary, in 2006.

TOEIC is one of the most well-known and popular English tests in Korea, and many universities and companies require TOEIC scores for graduation or job applications. According to the Committee, more than 2 million people took the exam in 2013 alone in the country.

Toward the end of 2005, there was a shift in South Korea, regarded as the second biggest consumer of the TOEIC per capita. However, a person's TOEIC score is still a major factor in hiring people for most professional jobs in South Korea. Starting in 2011, Korean universities were no longer permitted to use TOEIC and TOEFL scores as part of the admission process. However, many universities in Korea still require a minimum score of 900. Thus, many universities in Korea require TOEIC scores for graduation or selection of overseas trainees. This is apparently to discourage private English education (there are many private institutions that teach TOEIC-based classes). TEPS, another English proficiency test (developed by Seoul National University, Chosun Ilbo), has been created as an alternative to TOEIC tests. However, it is considered unlikely to replace the status of TOEIC.

=== Taiwan ===
Chun Shin Limited (Chinese: 忠欣股份有限公司; pinyin: Zhōngxīn Gǔfèn Yǒuxiàn Gōngsī) administers the TOEIC test in Taiwan. In 2003, the Ministry of Education introduced English Graduation Benchmark Policy (EGB), enforcing universities in Taiwan to set English requirements for undergraduates. TOEIC benefited from this policy and its lower registration fees, and became a popular test for English proficiency in Taiwan. TOEIC has also become a widespread measurement of Taiwanese people's English ability. For example, Rosalia Wu, a member of the Legislative Yuan, used the TOEIC score to advocate English as an official language.

The policy sparked controversies for various reasons. For the TOEIC, educators were concerned about undergraduates' economic burden from the TOEIC registration fee and the conflict of interest between universities and the company operating TOEIC.

In 2016, a National Chengchi University (NCCU) student sued NCCU to challenge the EGB policy. In September 2018, the Supreme Administrative Court ordered the policy to be discarded, while the NCCU abolished the policy in January.

=== Thailand ===
The Center for Professional Assessment offers regular institutional testing every Monday through Saturday at 9:00AM and 1:00PM (local time).

=== United Kingdom ===
The TOEIC was a Home Office-accredited test for students applying for a UK visa.

In 2014, an undercover investigation by the BBC program Panorama exposed systematic cheating and fraud by a number of organizations and individuals involved in running the test. Cheating was found to take place at Eden College International in London, where freelance invigilators used to conduct the exam. The college claimed no prior knowledge of the cheating, and had previously sacked three invigilators. ETS stated it does not hire the invigilators and that it does everything it can to prevent cheating.

On 17 April 2014, ETS decided not to renew its license as a provider of a Secure English Language Test (SELT). This means that these English language tests are no longer honored for the purpose of being issued a UK visa.

In June 2014, the Home Office undertook its own investigation and claimed to have found 46,000 "invalid and questionable" tests. It suspended the TOEIC exam as being valid for entry to the UK. It also canceled the visas of around 45,000 students, seventy percent of whom were Indian. Some left voluntarily, but the majority were deported.

In March 2016, a tribunal ruled that the evidence the Home Office used to deport the students was not strong enough. As of April 2019, over 300 legal appeals against the government were pending, and the National Audit Office had opened an investigation into the government's handling of the issue, which some Members of Parliament had likened to the Windrush scandal.

=== United States ===
Both the TOEIC Listening & Reading and the TOEIC Speaking & Writing tests are now available in the United States. While the TOEIC Listening & Reading test has been available for decades, the TOEIC Speaking & Writing test was introduced in the United States only in 2009. Registration for the TOEIC Speaking & Writing test is handled by the English4Success division of the nonprofit organization Amideast.

== See also ==
- English language learning and teaching
- G-TELP, General Tests of English Language Proficiency
- IELTS, International English Language Testing System
- TEPS, Test of English Proficiency
- TOEFL, Test of English as a Foreign Language
