= Test of English as a Foreign Language =

Standardized test

- Logo used since 2024
- Acronym: TOEFL
- Type: Internet-based or paper-based standardized test.
- Administrator: Educational Testing Service
- Skills tested: Reading, listening, speaking and writing of the English language.
- Purpose: To assess the English language proficiency of non-native English speakers.
- Year started: 1964; 62 years ago
- Duration: Internet-based test (iBT): 2 hours.; Paper-delivered test: 2 hours 25 minutes.
- Score range: iBT: 0 to 30 (in 1-point increments) on each of the 4 sections. So a total of 0 to 120. PBT: Reading: 0 to 30, listening: 0 to 30, Writing: 0 to 30. No overall score.
- Score validity: 2 years
- Offered: iBT: More than 50 times a year.
- Restrictions on attempts: iBT: Can be taken only once in any 3-day period.
- Regions: 4,500 test centers in over 190 countries and territories.
- Languages: English
- Annual number of test takers: 2.3 million
- Prerequisites: No official prerequisite. Intended for non-native English speakers.
- Fee: iBT: US$ 185 and up, depending on the country.
- Used by: More than 11,000 colleges, agencies, and other institutions in over 150 countries.
- Website: ets.org/toefl

The Test of English as a Foreign Language (TOEFL /ˈtoʊfəl/ TOH-fəl) is a standardized test to measure the English language ability of non-native speakers wishing to enroll in English-speaking universities. The test is accepted by more than 13,000 universities and other institutions in over 160 countries and territories. The TOEFL is one of several major English-language tests worldwide, including IELTS, PTE, Duolingo English Test, Cambridge Assessment English, and Trinity College London exams.

TOEFL is a trademark of the Educational Testing Service (ETS), a private non-profit organization, which designs and administers the tests. ETS issues official score reports which are sent independently to institutions and are valid for two years following the test.

== History ==
In 1962, a national council made up of representatives of thirty government and private organizations was formed to address the problem of ensuring English language proficiency for non-native speakers wishing to study at U.S. universities. This council recommended the development and administration of the TOEFL for the 1963–1965 timings.

The test was initially developed at the Center for Applied Linguistics under the direction of Stanford University applied linguistics professor Charles A. Ferguson.

The TOEFL was first administered in 1964 by the Modern Language Association financed by grants from the Ford Foundation and Danforth Foundation.

In 1965, The College Board and ETS jointly assumed responsibility for continuing the TOEFL testing program.

In 1973, a cooperative arrangement was made between ETS, The College Board, and the Graduate Record Examinations board of advisers to oversee and run the program. ETS was to administer the exam with the guidance of the TOEFL board.

To the present day, college admission criteria for international students who are nationals of some of the Commonwealth nations exempt them from taking the TOEFL. Nations that are part of the English-speaking world (from most Commonwealth realms to former British colonies e.g., Hong Kong SAR or former/protectorates of the United States (Philippines, Puerto Rico), where English is the de facto official language, automatically grant a TOEFL exemption with some restrictions (e.g., residents of Quebec are required to take TOEFL while the rest of Canada is exempt – also inclusive of Commonwealth nations where English is not an official language e.g., Mozambique or Namibia (English is co-official but spoken by 3% of the population). However, this does not apply to some Commonwealth nations outside the Anglosphere, due to the IELTS, such as India, Pakistan, Bangladesh, etc., even though they may have English as the de facto official language.

== Formats and content ==
=== Internet-based test ===
The TOEFL Internet-based test (iBT) measures all four academic English skills: reading, listening, speaking, and writing. Since its introduction in late 2005, the Internet-based Test format has progressively replaced computer-based tests (CBT) and paper-based tests (PBT), although paper-based testing is still used in select areas. The TOEFL iBT test has been introduced in phases, with the United States, Canada, France, Germany, and Italy in 2005 and the rest of the world in 2006, with test centers added regularly. It is offered weekly at authorized test centers. The CBT was discontinued in September 2006 and these scores are no longer valid.

Initially, the demand for test seats was higher than availability, and candidates had to wait for months. It is now possible to take the test within one to four weeks in most countries. Now, people who wish to take the test create an account on the official website to find the closest place. In the past this test lasted 4 hours, today people can choose to take the test for around 3 hours.

The test consists of four sections, each measuring one of the basic language skills (while some tasks require integrating multiple skills), and all tasks focus on the language used in an academic, higher-education environment. Note-taking is allowed during the TOEFL iBT test. The test cannot be taken more than once every 3 days, starting from September 2019.

Countries and territories offering the TOEFL iBT test
- Afghanistan
- Albania
- Algeria
- American Samoa
- Andorra
- Angola
- Argentina
- Armenia
- Aruba
- Australia
- Austria
- Azerbaijan
- Bahamas
- Bahrain
- Bangladesh
- Belarus
- Belgium
- Benin
- Bermuda
- Bhutan
- Bolivia
- Bosnia and Herzegovina
- Botswana
- Brazil
- Bulgaria
- Burkina Faso
- Burundi
- Cambodia
- Cameroon
- Canada
- Cape Verde
- Chad
- Chile
- People's Republic of China
- Colombia
- Congo (DRC)
- Congo Republic
- Costa Rica
- Cote d'Ivoire (Ivory Coast)
- Croatia
- Cuba
- Cyprus
- Czech Republic
- Czechoslovakia and Slovenia
- Denmark
- Djibouti
- Dominican Republic
- Ecuador
- Egypt
- El Salvador
- Equatorial Guinea
- Estonia
- Ethiopia
- Finland
- France
- French Polynesia
- Gabon
- Georgia
- Germany
- Ghana
- Greece
- Guadeloupe
- Guam
- Guatemala
- Guinea
- Haiti
- Honduras
- Hong Kong, China
- Hungary
- Iceland
- India
- Indonesia
- Iran
- Iraq
- Ireland
- Israel
- Italy
- Jamaica
- Japan
- Jordan
- Kazakhstan
- Kenya
- Korea (ROK)
- Kosovo
- Kuwait
- Kyrgyzstan
- Laos
- Latvia
- Lebanon
- Libya
- Lithuania
- Luxembourg
- Macau, China
- Madagascar
- Malawi
- Malaysia
- Mali
- Malta
- Marshall Islands
- Martinique
- Mauritania
- Mauritius
- Mexico
- Micronesia
- Moldova
- Monaco
- Mongolia
- Montenegro
- Morocco
- Mozambique
- Myanmar (Burma)
- Namibia
- Nepal
- Netherlands
- Netherlands Antilles
- New Zealand
- Nicaragua
- Nigeria
- North Macedonia
- Northern Mariana Islands
- Norway
- Oman
- Pakistan
- Occupied Palestinian Territory
- Panama
- Paraguay
- Peru
- Philippines
- Poland
- Portugal
- Puerto Rico
- Qatar
- Reunion
- Romania
- Russia
- Rwanda
- Samoa
- Saudi Arabia
- Senegal
- Serbia
- Sierra Leone
- Singapore
- Slovak Republic
- South Africa
- South Sudan
- Spain
- Sri Lanka
- Sudan
- Suriname
- Swaziland
- Sweden
- Switzerland
- Syria
- Taiwan
- Tajikistan
- Tanzania
- Thailand
- Togo
- Trinidad and Tobago
- Tunisia
- Turkey
- Turkmenistan
- Uganda
- Ukraine
- United Arab Emirates
- United States of America
- United Kingdom
- Uruguay
- U.S. Virgin Islands
- Uzbekistan
- Venezuela
- Vietnam
- West Bank
- Yemen
- Zambia
- Zimbabwe

1. Reading
  The Reading section consists of 2 reading passages, each approximately 700 words in length and with 10 questions per passage. The passages are on academic topics whose material is taken from undergraduate university textbooks. Passages require an understanding of rhetorical functions such as cause-effect, compare-contrast, and argumentation. Students answer questions about main ideas, details, inferences, essential information, sentence insertion, vocabulary, rhetorical purpose, and overall ideas. New types of questions in the TOEFL iBT test require filling out tables or completing summaries. Prior knowledge of the subject under discussion is not necessary to come to the correct answer.
2. Listening
  The Listening section consists of questions on 2 conversations with 5 questions each and 3 lectures with 6 questions each, thus there are a total of 28 questions in this section. Each conversation is 3 minutes and lectures are 3-5 minutes in length. The conversations involve a student and either a professor or a campus service provider. The lectures are a self-contained portion of an academic lecture, which may involve student participation and do not assume specialized background knowledge in the subject area. Each conversation and lecture passage is heard only once. Test-takers may take notes while they listen and they may refer to their notes when they answer the questions. The listening questions are meant to measure the ability to understand main ideas, important details, implications, relationships between ideas, organization of information, speaker purpose, and speaker attitude.
3. Speaking
  The Speaking section consists of 4 tasks: 1 independent (Task 1) and 3 integrated (Task 2, 3, 4). In task 1, test-takers answer opinion questions on familiar topics. They are evaluated on their ability to speak spontaneously and convey their ideas clearly and coherently. In tasks 2 and 4, test-takers read a short passage, listen to an academic course lecture or a conversation about campus life, and answer a question by combining appropriate information from the text and the talk. In task 3, test-takers listen to an academic course lecture and then respond to a question about what they heard. In the integrated tasks, test-takers are evaluated on their ability to appropriately synthesize and effectively convey information from the reading and listening material. Test-takers may take notes as they read and listen and may use their notes to help prepare their responses. Test-takers are given a preparation time of 15-30 seconds before they have to begin speaking their part, for which they are given 45–60 seconds. The responses are digitally recorded, sent to ETS's Online Scoring Network (OSN), and evaluated by three to six raters.
4. Writing
  The Writing section measures a test taker's ability to write in an academic setting and consists of two tasks: one integrated (20 minutes) and one independent (10 minutes). In the integrated task, test-takers read a passage on an academic topic and then listen to a speaker discuss it. The test-taker then writes a summary of the important points in the listening passage and explains how these relate to the key points of the reading passage. In the independent task, the test-taker must write an essay that states their opinion or choice, and then explain it, rather than simply listing personal preferences or choices. Responses are sent to the ETS OSN and evaluated by at least 3 different raters.

Task	Description	Approximate time
Reading	20 questions in total	35 minutes
Listening	28 questions in total	36 minutes
Speaking	4 tasks	16 minutes
Writing	2 tasks	29 minutes

One of the sections of the test will include extra, uncounted material. Educational Testing Service includes extra material to pilot test questions for future test forms. When test-takers are given a longer section, they should give equal effort to all of the questions because they do not know which question will count and which will be considered extra. For example, if there are four reading passages instead of three, then one of the passages will not be counted. Any of the four could be the uncounted one.

=== Home edition ===
The TOEFL IBT Home Edition is essentially the same test as the TOEFL IBT. However, it is taken at home while a human proctor watches through a web camera (usually built-in to most laptops) and via sharing of the computer screen. The popularity of the Home Edition has grown during the COVID-19 pandemic as it has been the only option during lockdowns. Many students experience technical or security problems during the Home Edition tests. The ETS browser used to administer the test has been unreliable in many cases. Students who have their exams interrupted are not likely to get a refund or the chance to reschedule for a new test as the ETS has technical problems that are hard to document and the processing of a complaint is slow due to the popularity of the Home Edition and the number of complaints. If the test runs smoothly, the results are accepted by most companies and universities that accept the TOEFL IBT standard edition.

=== Paper-delivered test ===
The TOEFL paper-delivered test is an official test for use where the internet test is unavailable, usually due to internet or computer issues.

It consists of the Listening, Reading, and Writing sections, with scores that are on the same scale as the Internet-Based Test. There is no total score. Not all centers have the possibility of delivering this type of test, so it will generally be necessary to reschedule the day of the test for another available day.

==== Paper-based test ====
The TOEFL paper-based test (PBT) was still available in limited areas until 2017 when it was replaced by the paper-delivered test. Scores are valid for two years after the test date, and test takers can have their scores sent to institutions or face time.

1. Listening (30 – 40 minutes)
  The Listening section consists of 3 parts. The first one contains 30 questions about short conversations. The second part has 8 questions about longer conversations. The last part asks 12 questions about lectures or talks. Harder questions are worth two scores.
2. Structure and Written Expression (25 minutes)
  The Structure and Written Expression section has 15 exercises for completing sentences correctly and 25 exercises for identifying errors. Harder questions are worth two scores.
3. Reading Comprehension (55 minutes)
  The Reading Comprehension section has 50 questions about reading passages. Harder questions are worth two scores.
4. Writing (30 minutes)
  The TOEFL PBT administrations include a writing test called the Test of Written English (TWE). This is one essay question with 250–300 words on average.

=== Accommodations ===
There are three different categories of accommodations that can be utilized for TOEFL test takers. Some of these accommodations are available for all students and some are only available for those with certain disabilities. If the accommodation the student requires is not available then requests can be made through the Testing Accommodations Request Form. For questions, ETS provides Disability Services that can be contacted.

1. Technical Accommodations
  - Screen Magnification
  - Selectable background and foreground
  - Kensington Trackball mouse
  - IntelliKeys keyboard
  - Ergonomic Keyboard
  - Keyboard with touchpad
2. Specialized Assistance
  - Sign language interpreter for spoken directions only
  - Oral interpreter for spoken directions only
  - Oral interpreter for the Listening section only
  - Writer/recorder of answers
  - Test reader
3. Adaptive Accommodations
  - Audio version of the test
  - Reader's script version of the test
  - Braille test (in contracted or uncontracted Braille)
  - Braille test with reader's script
  - Large-print version of the test
  - Regular print version of the test
  - Listening section omitted
  - Speaking section omitted
  - Extended testing time
  - Additional rest breaks
  - Transcripts of audio elements in Speaking and Writing sections.

== Test scores ==
=== TOEFL iBT test ===
- The TOEFL iBT test is scored on a scale of 0 to 120 points.
- Each of the four sections (Reading, Listening, Speaking, and Writing) receives a scaled score from 0 to 30. The scaled scores from the four sections are added together to determine the total score.
- The reading and listening sections are tested first, followed by a ten-minute break. The speaking and writing sections are then completed following the break. A maximum amount of 203 minutes is allowed to complete the whole exam process.
- Each speaking question is initially given a raw score of 0 to 4, with a 1-point increment, and each writing question is initially given a raw score of 0.0 to 5.0, with a 0.5-point increment. These scores are converted to scaled scores of 0 to 30.

=== Paper-based test (PBT) ===
- The final PBT score ranges between 0 and 677 and is based on three subscores: Listening (0–68), Structure (0–68), and Reading (0–67). The minimum possible score is 310, which corresponds to 31 scores for each section. Unlike the CBT, the score of the Writing component (referred to as the Test of Written English, TWE) is not part of the final score; instead, it is reported separately on a scale of 0–6.
- The score test takers receive on the Listening, Structure, and Reading parts of the TOEFL is not the percentage of correct answers. The score is converted to take into account the fact that some tests are more difficult than others. The converted scores correct these differences. Therefore, the converted score is a more accurate reflection of the ability than the raw score.

The TOEFL PBT was discontinued at the end of May 2017. Official testing in areas without internet or computers now uses the TOEFL PDT.

=== Accepted TOEFL scores ===
Most colleges use TOEFL scores as only one factor in their admission process, with a college or program within a college often setting a minimum TOEFL score required. The minimum TOEFL iBT scores range from 64 (Conservatorium van Amsterdam) to 110 (University of Oxford).

ETS has released tables to convert between iBT, CBT, and PBT scores.

== TOEFL ITP tests ==
TOEFL ITP ("ITP" stands for "Institutional Testing Program") tests are paper-based and use academic content to evaluate the English-language proficiency of non-native English speakers. The tests use new and previously administered TOEFL questions and are used for placement, progress, evaluation, exit testing, and other situations. The test scores, format, and content of the test match the "TOEFL PBT", with the exception of not including the TWE (Test of Written Expression).

Unlike the TOEFL iBT and PBT tests, TOEFL ITP tests are administered by the institution and for internal use. It should not replace the need for the TOEFL iBT test, which is administered securely and includes Speaking and Writing components. There are two levels of TOEFL ITP: Level 1 (intermediate to advanced) and Level 2 (high beginning to intermediate). TOEFL ITP scores are mapped to the CEFR and test takers are provided with a certificate of achievement.

== TOEFL Junior tests ==
ETS also offers the TOEFL Junior tests, a general assessment of middle school-level English-language proficiency. It is intended for students aged 11+. The tests are administered in two formats: TOEFL Junior Standard (on paper) and TOEFL Junior Comprehensive (via computer). The TOEFL Junior Standard test has three sections: Reading Comprehension, Listening Comprehension, and Language Form and Meaning. The TOEFL Junior Comprehensive test has four: Reading Comprehension, Listening Comprehension, Speaking, and Writing. TOEFL Junior scores are mapped to the Common European Framework of Reference for Languages (CEFR) and test takers are provided with a certificate of achievement.

The test is scored on a scale of 0 to 300 on each section, added up to determine the total score (0–900). The minimum passing score is 600, corresponding to 200 scores for each section.

== TOEFL Primary test ==
The TOEFL family of tests has also created the TOEFL Primary test. It is designed for students between the ages of eight and eleven. The test is divided into 3 sections: reading and listening – step 1, reading and listening – step 2, and speaking. Depending on the fluency of students' English, they will be expected to take either the step 1 or step 2 test. Students are expected to take two of the three sections, depending on their communicative skills in English. They will take either the step 1 or step 2 test. The reading and listening tests can be done on paper or digitally, but the speaking test is only available digitally.

While the other TOEFL scores are valid for two years, this test is only valid for one. This is because of how quickly children grow in their communicative abilities.

Scores for these tests range from 101–115 for the reading and listening, and 1–27 for the speaking portion.

== Linking TOEFL Total Score ranges to other scores ==
IELTS Band	TOEFL iBT Total Score	TOEFL PBT Total Score	CEFR	User Competency
9.0	118–120	677	C2	Expert User
8.5	115–117	666–676	C2	Very Good User
8.0	110–114	637–665	C1	Very Good User
7.5	102–109	610–636	C1	Good User
7.0	94–101	587–609	C1	Good User
6.5	79–93	550–586	B2	Competent User
6.0	60–78	500–549	B2	Competent User
5.5	46–59	451–499	B2	Modest User
5.0	35–45	417–450	B1	Modest User
4.5	32–34	400–416	B1	Limited User
4.0	30–31	391–399	B1	Limited User
3.5	20–29	390	A2	Extremely Limited User
3.0	14–21	350–389	A2	Extremely Limited User
2.5	10–13	335–340	A1	Intermittent User
2.0	7–9	329–334	A1	Intermittent User
1.5	4–6	320–328	A1	Non User
1.0	1–3	310–321	A1	Non User
0.5	N/A	100–309	N/A	Non User
0	0	0	N/A	Not Attempt User

Note: the above comparison scores are provided by ETS, the company that creates the TOEFL. Other charts show different ranges.

TOEFL iBT Total Score Compared to IELTS Band*

TOEFL iBT Total Score (0–120)	IELTS Band (0–9)
118	9
115	8.5
110	8
102	7.5
94	7
79	6.5
60	6
46	5.5
35	5
32	4.5
30	4
0–29	0–3.5

- Note: the above comparison scores are provided by ETS, the company that creates the TOEFL.

TOEFL iBT Total Score (0–120)	IELTS Band (0–9)	Duolingo English Test Score (10–160)
120	8.5–9	160
119	8	155
117-118	8	150
113-116	7.5	145
109-112	7.5	140
104-108	7	135
98-103	7	130
93-97	6.5	125
87-92	6.5	120
82-86	6	115
76-81	6	110
70-75	6	105
65–69	5.5	100
59–64	5.5	95
53–58	5	90
47–52	5	85
41-46	5	80
35-40	4.5	75
30-34	4.5	70
24-29	4.5	65
17-23	4	55-60
1–16	1–3.5	10–50
0	0	N/A
Sample: TOEFL iBT data included 328 official score reports and 1,095 self-reported scores. IELTS Academic data included 1,643 official score reports and 4,420 self-reported scores

- Note: the above comparison scores are provided by Duolingo, the company that creates the DET test.

CEFR	TOEFL	Reading	Listening	Speaking	Writing
C1	95	24	22	25	24
B2	72	18	17	20	17
B1	42	4	9	16	13
A2	N/A	N/A	N/A	10	7

== See also ==
- List of admissions tests
- English as a Foreign or Second Language (EFSL)
- General Tests of English Language Proficiency (G-TELP)
- International English Language Testing System (IELTS)
- International Student Admissions Test (ISAT)
- National Accreditation Authority for Translators and Interpreters (NAATI)
- Oxford Test of English
- Teaching English as a foreign language (TEFL)
- Test of English for International Communication (TOEIC)
- Pearson Test of English Academic (PTE)
- Standardized test
- UBELT University of Bath English Language Test.
- Cambridge Assessment English
- LNAT
- Trinity College London ESOL
- The European Language Certificates (TELC)
- EF Standard English Test
- WIDA Consortium

== Notes and references ==
- "Test and Score Summary for TOEFL Internet Based Test: September 2005 – December 2006 Test Data", Educational Testing Service, 2007
