= Alliance Française de Dhaka =

- আলিয়ঁস ফ্রঁসেজ দ্য ঢাকা
- Official logo

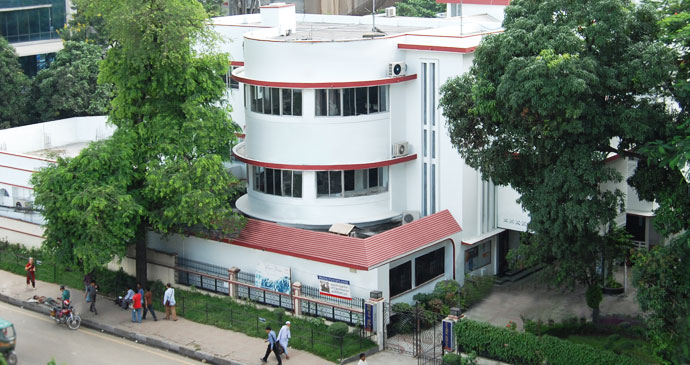
- Headquarter in Dhanmondi, Dhaka
- Formation: 1959
- Type: Cultural Institution, Language Learning Center
- Legal status: Active
- Headquarters: Dhanmondi
- Region served: Dhaka
- Services: French cultural and language education
- Official language: French
- Owner: Culture of France
- President: Abdul Majid Chowdhury
- Vice-President: Nadia Samdani
- Secretary: Imroz Hassan Chowdhury
- Key people: François Grosjean (Director)
- Website: afdhaka.org

Alliance Française de Dhaka (French pronunciation: [aljɑ̃s fʁɑ̃sɛːz də daka]; Bengali: আলিয়ঁস ফ্রঁসেজ দ্য ঢাকা) or AFD is a nonprofit organization which has been working in Bangladesh since 1959. It is located at Dhanmondi, Dhaka. Sometimes referred as the French Cultural Center, Alliance Française de Dhaka works independently in close liaison with the High Commission of France in Bangladesh.

== Location ==
Alliance Française de Dhaka is located at 26 Mirpur Road, Dhanmondi, Dhaka. As of 2012, two branches have been established at Gulshan and Uttara.

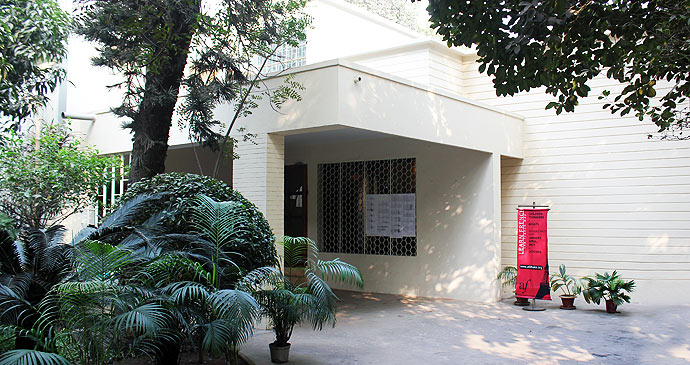
Gulshan Branch

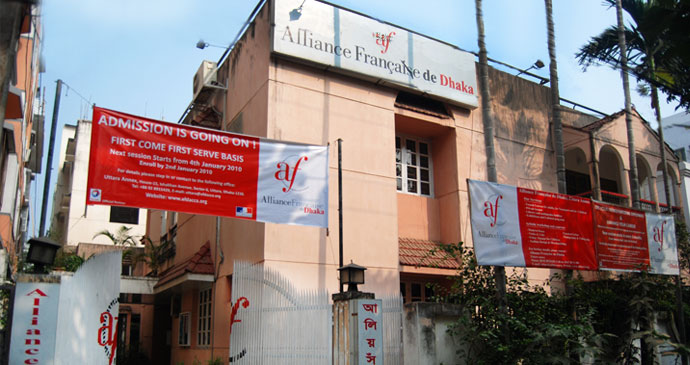
Uttara Branch

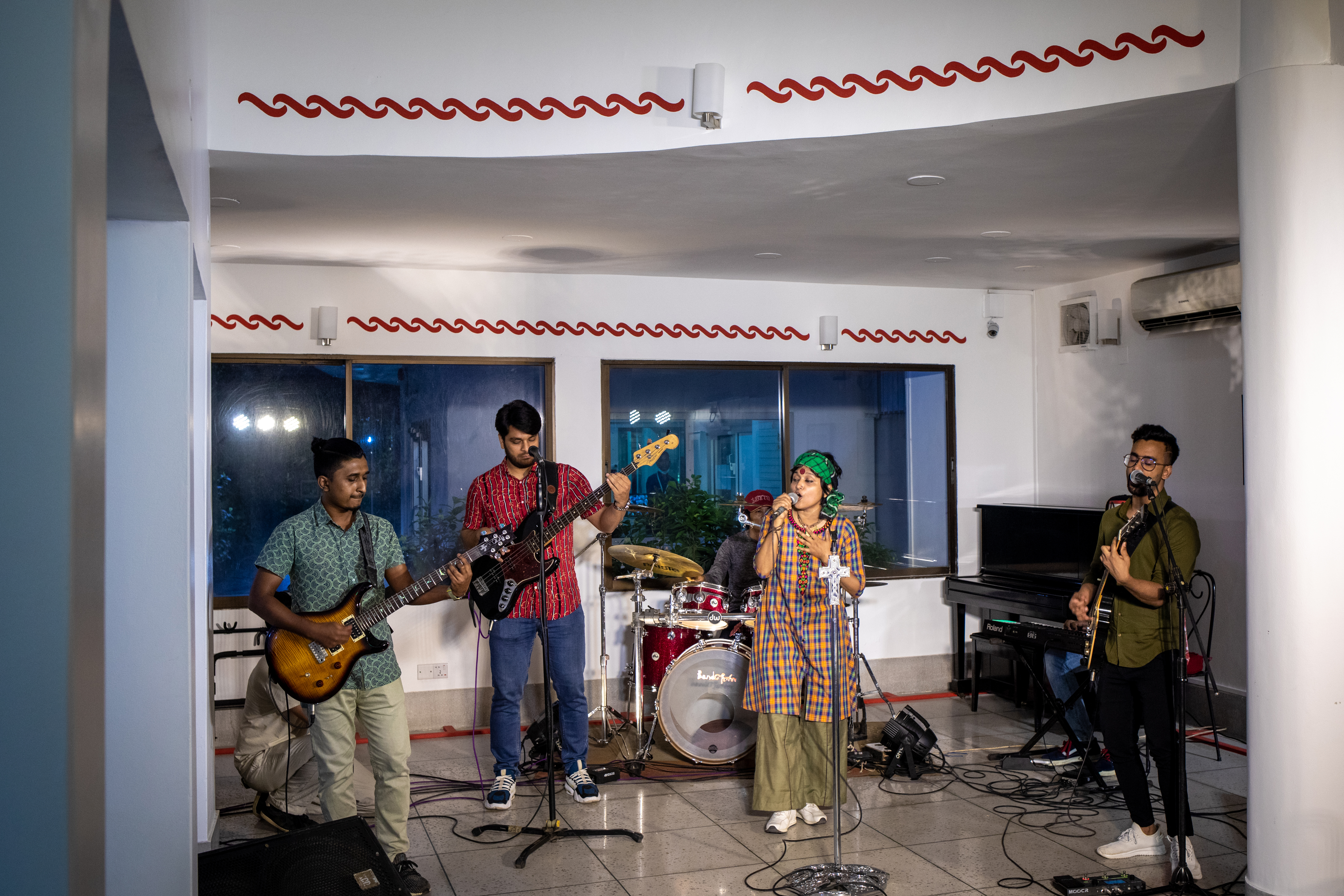
Band Lalon is performing at Alliance Française de Dhaka

== Function ==
Alliance Française de Dhaka promotes French culture, especially the French language to the local people of Bangladesh and at the same time, promotes the local Bangladeshi culture in France. The centre functions as a hub for various cultural activities, featuring regular exhibitions of art, music, films, as well as a cafe and a library on its premises.

== Courses ==
Courses in French as a foreign language conform to the CEFR and Cadre européen commun de référence pour les langues (CECR).

Alliance Française de Dhaka organizes four sessions of courses each spanning for three months per year. There are three age groups: children (9-12), teenagers (13-15) and adults (16+). International exams like DELF, DALF, Test de connaissance du français (TCF), Test d'évaluation du français (TEF), and Diplôme d'Aptitude à l'Enseignement du Français Langue Étrangère (DAEFLE) are offered for all eligible students. Alliance Française de Dhaka has been preparing private, corporate, tailor-made, and external courses for corporations and institutions like Bangladesh military and police personnel as well as tailor-made courses for diplomats and high ranking functionaries.

The centre provides a range of artistic courses, including piano, violin, photography, guitar, interior and fashion designing, dance, as well as catering to exotic interests like rooftop gardening, French cooking classes.

== See also ==
- Alliance française
