= Test d'évaluation de français =

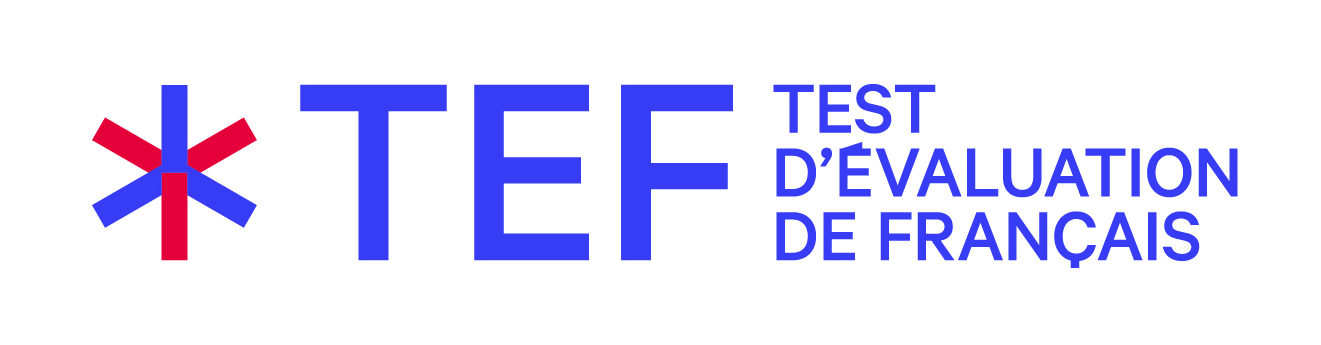
- Type: standardized test
- Year started: 1998
- Website: https://www.lefrancaisdesaffaires.fr/candidat/test-evaluation-francais/

The Test d'évaluation de français (TEF, or French Assessment Test) is a standardized language test for French as a foreign language. It assesses general French comprehension and expression skills. Results are aligned with the levels of the Common European Framework of Reference for Languages (CEFR) established by the Council of Europe.

Created in 1998 by Le français des affaires, a department of the Paris Île-de-France Regional Chamber of Commerce and Industry, it is officially recognized by:

- French Ministry of Higher Education, Research and Innovation and the Ministry of the Interior
- Swiss State Secretariat for Migration
- Immigration, Refugees and Citizenship Canada;
- Quebec Ministry of Immigration, Francisation and Integration

To meet the needs of candidates, the TEF is offered in five different versions:

- TEF Études
- TEF Intégration, Résidence et Nationalité (IRN)
- TEF Canada
- TEF Québec (TEFAQ)
- TEF for All Audiences

== TEF Études ==
The TEF for studies in France has been officially recognized since 2004 by the Minister of Higher Education, Research and Innovation as part of the DAP (Demande d'admission préalable) procedure for first-time enrollment in an undergraduate university program. It is intended for any foreign student applying for first-year undergraduate studies in a French university.

Skills assessed:

1. Reading comprehension: 60 min – 40 questions
2. Listening comprehension: 40 min – 40 questions
3. Written expression: 60 min – 2 tasks
4. Vocabulary and structures: 30 min – 40 questions

To prove sufficient French proficiency for first-year university enrollment, candidates must score at least 400/699 in the written components of the TEF.

TEF Études can also be used to certify one's level of French for admission into French-speaking higher education institutions, such as universities, business schools, engineering schools in France, and colleges or universities in Canada and other francophone countries.

For non-DAP admission procedures, required tests and minimum scores vary by institution.

== TEF IRN ==
The TEF IRN has been recognized since 2012 by the Ministry of the Interior, Overseas France, Local Authorities and Immigration to certify French language proficiency for applications for French nationality (minimum level B1 of the CEFR required) and long-term resident permits (minimum level A2 of the CEFR required).

Skills assessed:

- Reading comprehension: 30 min – 20 questions
- Listening comprehension: 20 min – 20 questions
- Written expression: 30 min – 2 tasks
- Spoken expression: 10 min – 2 tasks

== TEF Canada ==
TEF Canada is designated by Immigration, Refugees and Citizenship Canada and Quebec's Ministry of Immigration, Francisation and Integration for all economic immigration programs that require or accept proof of language proficiency. It is available to anyone planning to immigrate to Canada and to apply for Canadian citizenship.

TEF Canada assesses four skills in French:

- Reading comprehension: 60 min – 40 questions
- Listening comprehension: 40 min – 40 questions
- Written expression: 60 min – 2 tasks
- Spoken expression: 15 min – 2 tasks

It places candidates on a seven-level scale aligned with the CEFR and the Canadian Language Benchmarks (CLB).

== TEF Québec (TEFAQ) ==
TEFAQ is a general French test designed to assess oral language skills (i.e., listening comprehension and speaking). It is the TEF version recognized by the Ministry of Immigration, Francisation and Integration of Quebec for official immigration procedures. It is available to anyone intending to settle permanently in Quebec and to apply for Canadian citizenship.

The TEFAQ provides an oral French proficiency assessment (listening and speaking). Principal applicants may also take written comprehension and expression components to demonstrate written skills. It places candidates on a seven-level scale aligned with the CEFR. and Quebec's scale for adult immigrants' French language proficiency.

== See also ==
- Diplôme d'études en langue française
- Diplôme approfondi de langue française

=== External links ===
- Official website
