= Swedish as a foreign language =

Swedish as a foreign language is studied by about 40,000 people worldwide at the university level. It is taught at over two hundred universities and colleges in 38 countries. Swedish is the Scandinavian language most studied abroad.

Svenska Institutet (The Swedish Institute) plays a key role in organising the learning of Swedish abroad. In addition to collaborating with universities where Swedish is taught, the Institute organises summer courses for students and conferences for teachers, as well as publishing a textbook called Svenska utifrån. The SI offered a free Swedish course online from the 2010s to the end of 2022.

== Language classification ==
Swedish belongs to the North Germanic branch of the Germanic sub-family of the Indo-European languages. As such, it is mutually intelligible with Norwegian and Danish. Because most of the loanwords present in Swedish come from English and German (originally Middle Low German, closely related to Dutch), and also because of similarities in grammar, native speakers of Germanic languages usually have an advantage over speakers of other, less related languages.

The similarity between Swedish and English is further emphasized by many Old Norse words brought to England by the Vikings during the early Middle Ages.

== Difficulties for students ==
=== Phonology ===
One of the main difficulties encountered by students of Swedish is its phonology. Swedish words have either an acute or a grave accent, usually described as "tonal word accents" by Scandinavian linguists. These accents may vary between dialects and can be difficult for non-native speakers to distinguish. However, few words are only distinguished by their word accents, and these are usually easy to tell apart by context. In most Finland Swedish varieties, the distinction is absent.

Several phonemes of Swedish often present difficulties for students. Among the most difficult are the fricatives /s/, /ɕ/ and /ɧ/, which are all phonetically close to one another. Swedish also has a large inventory of vowels, which might be difficult to distinguish. The orthography might cause confusion, e.g. the diacritics in the letters Å, Ä and Ö. The difference between /l/ and /r/ can also present difficulties for speakers of languages that do not distinguish the two, such as Vietnamese.

=== Grammar ===
In Swedish, there is a grammatical gender distinction between common (en) and neuter (ett). Like other languages with noun classes, Swedish has few consistent rules to determine each word's gender; so the genders have to be learned word by word, although the words of common gender far outnumber the neuter words, and given morphological derivations consistently yield results of a certain gender, e.g. adding -ning to a verb always yields a common gender noun (röka → rökning, "to smoke → smoking") whereas adding -ande always yields a neuter gender noun (famla → famlande, "to fumble → fumbling").

Swedish has five ways to form regular plurals of nouns, also determined on a word-by-word basis, in addition to irregular plurals. These are -ar, -or, -er, -en and identical to singular.

As in English, there are many irregular verbs and plurals, such as fot; fötter ("foot; feet") and flyga; flög; flugit ("fly; flew; flown"), cf. Germanic umlaut and Germanic strong verb.

=== Syntax ===
Swedish utilizes V2 word order in subclauses, a phenomenon rarely encountered cross-linguistically.

=== Orthography ===
Certain common words retain their historical written form, e.g. mig /mεj/ and och /ɔk/ or /ɔ/. The pronoun de is pronounced /dɔm/ by most speakers, even though it has traditionally distinct written forms in the nominative (as well as used as a plural article) and accusative case.

== Geographic distribution ==
In addition to the minorities in Sweden, Swedish is a compulsory subject in school for Finnish-speakers in Finland, where Swedish is a co-official language with Finnish; a 5% minority of Finns use Swedish as a native language. In official documents and in education, Swedish is considered "the second domestic language" (fi. toinen kotimainen kieli, sv. det andra inhemska språket) for Finnish-speakers, while the same holds true for Finnish for Swedish-speakers. Finland was a part of Sweden from the 13th century to 1809, and the use of Swedish in government prevailed for much of 19th century. Language reforms did not replace Swedish, but gave Finnish (which is a completely unrelated Uralic language) an "equal status" as an official language of the state. This situation remains to this day, despite the near-complete switchover to Finnish in practical usage in governmental affairs. There is compulsory teaching and language testing at all levels of education, and a basic working knowledge of Swedish is required for state government officials.

== Proficiency tests ==
- Swedex consists of three levels corresponding to the A2, B1 and B2 levels in the Common European Framework of Reference for Languages. It can be taken in examination centers in twenty-five countries. Swedex tests the skills of the student in five areas: vocabulary, grammar, listening, writing and reading.
- TISUS is another certificate, often used as a proof of competence in Swedish to gain access to Swedish universities. It tests the reading, oral and written skills of the student.
- In Finland, there is an official examination in the universities, called "public servant's Swedish", as a part of the policy of bilinguality of the state of Finland. The abitur examination includes a Swedish exam, which, while itself optional, is based on compulsory courses in high school.

== See also ==
- Second language
- Language education
- Second language acquisition

== Sources ==
- (in Swedish) Elert, Claes-Christian (2000) Allmän och svensk fonetik Norstedts, Lund
