= Sprachenatelier Berlin =

Language school in Berlin, Germany

Logo of Sprachenatelier Berlin
Founded	2003
Headquarters	Berlin
Industry	Language schools
Webseite	www.sprachenatelier-berlin.de

Das Sprachenatelier Berlin - Institute for languages, art and culture was founded as both a language school and a studio, a place where intercultural encounters and creative exchange are combined in the context of language learning.

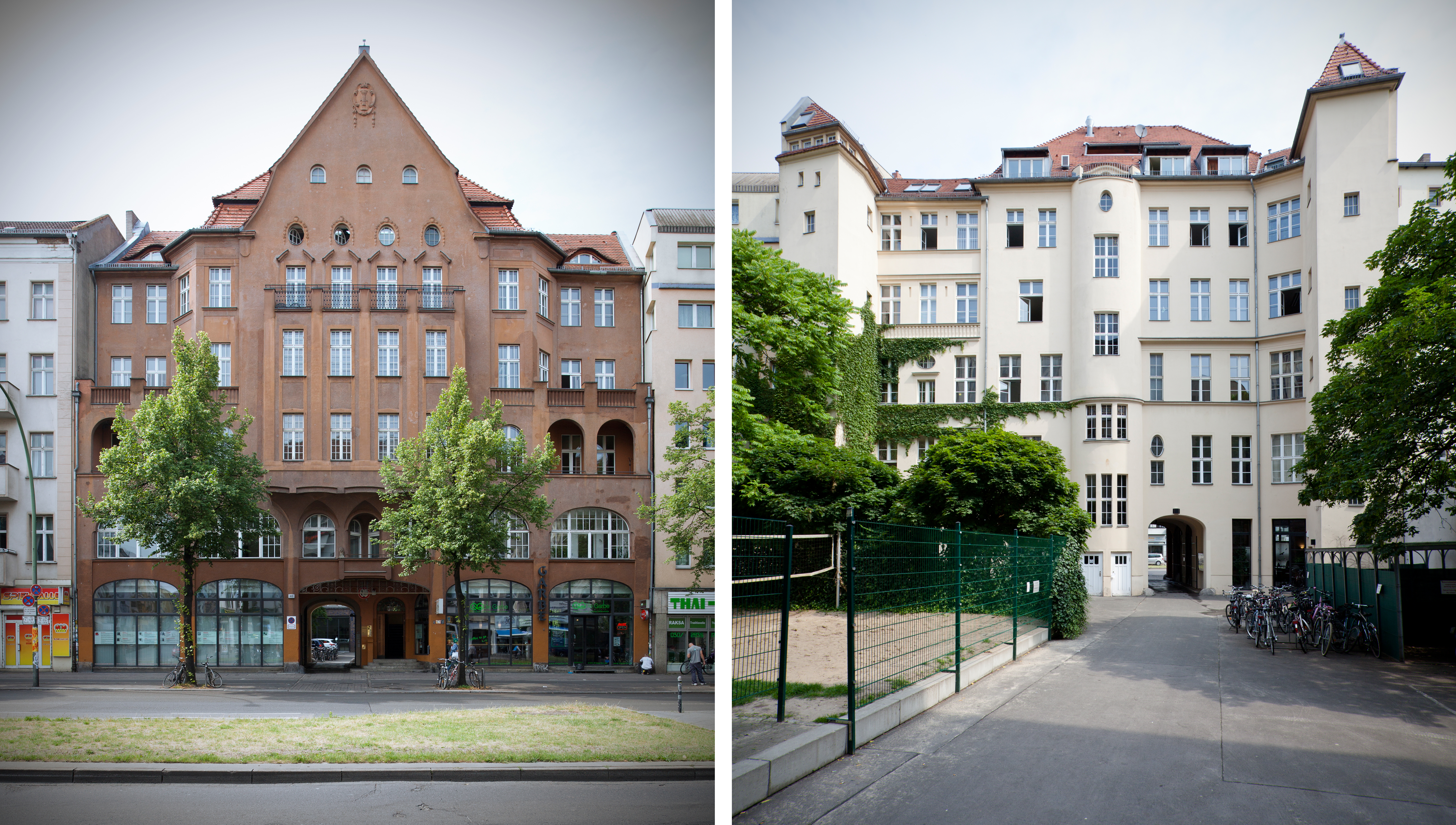
Facade of Haus Garbe

In addition to German language courses and courses in more than forty foreign languages, festivals, film evenings, readings, concerts, exhibitions, workshops, political discussions and seminars are also organised. The institute offers sufficient space for artists and creatives to organise events and reach a broad audience. Numerous performances, plays, film showings, dance and theatre workshops as well as all forms of exhibitions have taken place at the Sprachenatelier in the past.

Sprachenatelier's spaces are regularly used for political information and discussion forums with experts from many countries. Additionally, every year - besides the regular various language courses, there is always a broad offer of cultural events all students of the Sprachenatelier can join.

== Building ==
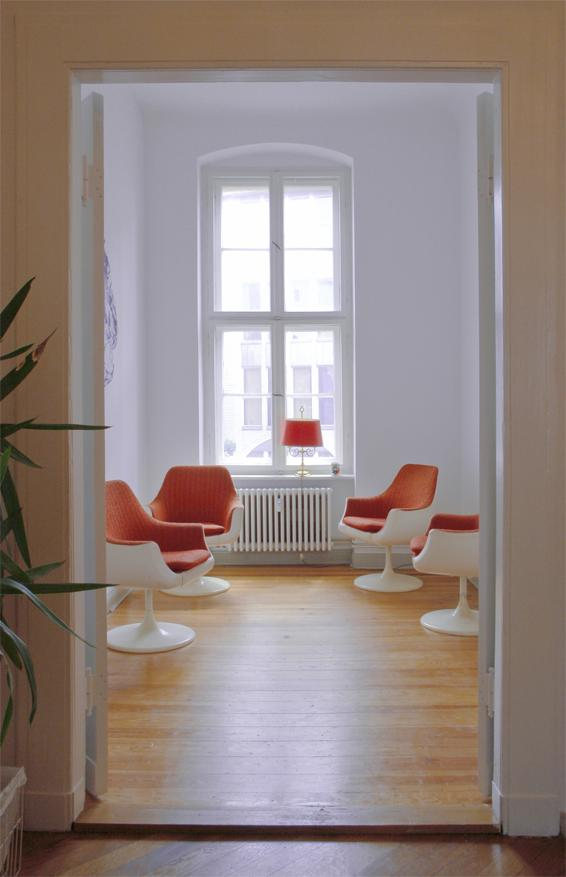
Space inside the House Garbe-today

Oskar Garbe, a master mason from Lichtenberg, Berlin, was a successful property developer around 1900. In Berlin he built the Erlöserkirche in Berlin (Church of the Redeemer) and the Samariterkirche (Samariter Church), various commercial buildings, a cabaret theatre and several luxury villas. In 1907 he built a prestigious residential building at 40 Frankfurter Allee, which is where the Sprachenatelier can be found today. The architect Hans Liepe developed the building's plans in 1906 for Mr Garbe, who himself designed the layout of the apartments and then lived on the second floor in a nine room apartment.

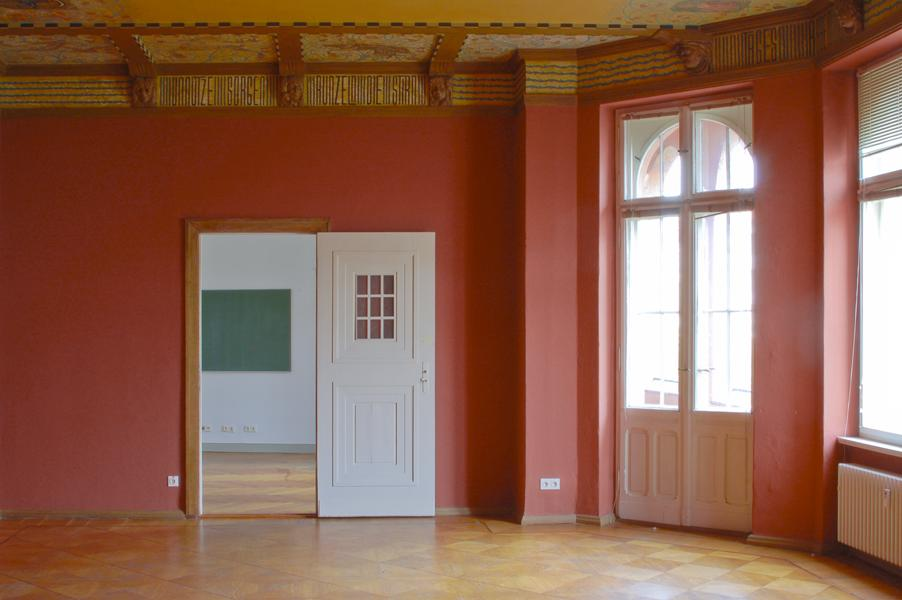
Jugendstil salon in Sprachenatelier Berlin (House Garbe)

The five-storey, red stucco-fronted building has a double-arched gable and a four sided central bay on the second and third floors with balcony. In the courtyard there is a five-storey, white klinkered industrial building with a further courtyard. The frontal facade was designed in an art nouveau style and is decorated with blue bricks. Users of the building until 1900 were principally furniture makers and shops. The complex is listed. Of particular interest are the rich, almost completely retained interior fittings in Art Nouveau style.

== Recognition ==
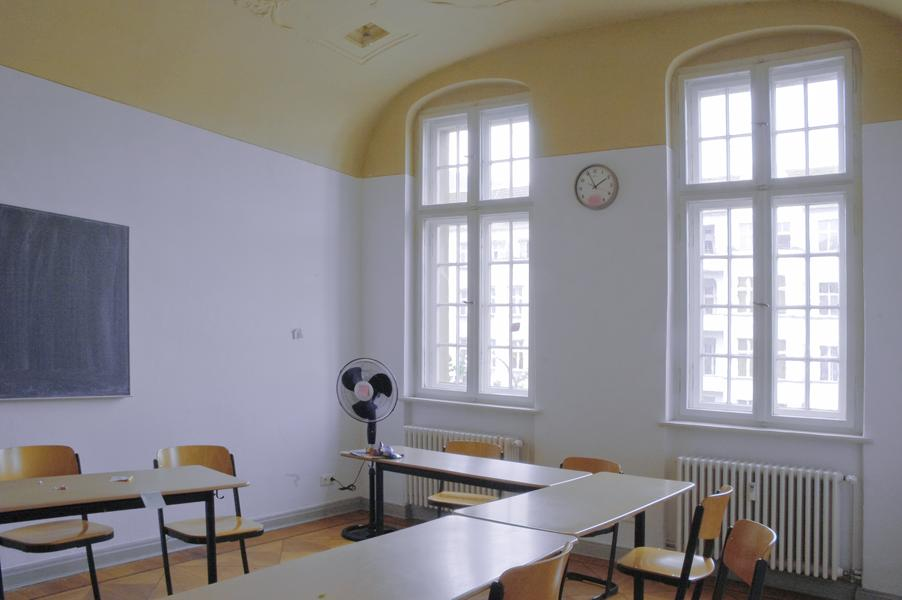
Classes in Sprachenatelier Berlin (House Garbe)

Sprachenatelier Berlin is officially recognised by the Berlin Senate, CSN Sweden National Board of Student Aid (Sweden), ANSA Norway Allianz Norwegischer Studenten im Ausland and EBACO in the Netherlands. It is a member of fadaf and also licensed test centre for all telc exams, for CnaVT, TCF Test de connaissance du français and Swedex.

=== Summer program ===
Every summer from June until the end of August, the Sprachenatelier Berlin offers numerous cultural programs for its students every week. While the language learners can choose between five different excursions and activities every day (from Monday until Friday) there are also weekend trips to famous German cities such as Potsdam, Dresden, Leipzig and many more. The normal "Sommerkulturprogramm" includes sightseeing through Berlin; visiting numerous exhibitions of all kinds as well as restaurants, bars and streetfood markets; going to open air cinemas; doing activities such as mini golf, playing volleyball or other sports as well as having barbecue together. An annual highlight of the summer program is the great Night of Talents.

=== Further Projects and events ===
The World is not my Village, an open forum for the discussion of themes such as globalisation, migration and environment, with a focus on people and their realm of experience.

...

It is 2014. The Earth is no longer flat and most people are no longer apes. Rather, they have learnt in the meantime what it was like at the beginning and also at the end for that matter. Soon the last spot of land on the Earth has been visited, captured by Google-Maps and extolled in a holiday song. And everything else that could be marketed, had been offered to the market and sold to the highest bidder. Since forests, mountains, rivers were soon cut down, destroyed and fished empty, everyone flocked to the city, where there remained neither sufficient space nor air to breathe. And even for the most fit everything leftover – Darwin's Jungle Book – had at some point become too dangerous for them to continue living out their superiority. However the people were connected to each other until the end. People told themselves that it was a significant advancement to hear about the death of Paris Hilton's dog, and also having the book at the touch of a button was a great thing. Because of electronic intercommunication a famous media theorist had in 1962 suggested that the world was growing into a "global village". Afterwards there was no longer any "outside". In the information age we were all neighbours, we bought our bread rolls, cobs, buns in the same bakeries - only the term used was still divisive. We had the same favourite drink, watched the same film at the cinema, used the same ringtone and wore the same clothes. In spring, summer, autumn and winter. "The world is not my Village", my neighbourhood, my barrio, the dump where I want to live. As a point of reference we choose a fourth world, the stars of fantasy, criticism and utopia, for it could be indeed different. For bread and peace, freedom and palaces! From the ancient philosopher Protagoras the following sentence: "Man is the measure of all things". Whoever, upon hearing this, only thinks of themselves, fails to recognise that the measure should be put against everyone and not just one person! Understood in this way, the title of the event series has, alongside the world-critical meaning, also one that is self-critical: one's own village is not the centre of the universe and the famous church is sometimes better located outside of the village. "The World is not my Village" is not to be understood as a blind criticism of a globalised world, nor as a taboo of individual opinion, rather as an invitation and a call to reflect upon both.

Kulturmittwoch is weekly, extracurricular cultural programme. Museum visits, neighbourhood walks, lectures or film showings offer an insight into German culture as well as the chance to put German language skills into practice and make new contacts.

== Other events ==
Other important events:

2014
- Polyglot Workshop at Sprachenatelier Berlin
- "Bê Deng (Sessiz)" - film screening and discussion with the director Rezan Yeşilbaş
- Berlin Street Art in Ukraine
- The world is not my village - reloaded

2013

- Culture Friday: Kapoor in Berlin
- The Great Night of Talents 2013 Sprachenatelier
- Reading and an exhibition with Bledar Mastori the Sprachenatelier Berlin

2012

- Reading with Nina Bussmann Sprachenatelier Berlin
- The great night of talent in Sprachenatelier

2011

- "Faces of Mesopotamia" photo exhibition by Murat Yazar
- Belarusian evening in Sprachenatelier

2010

- Reading with Ilma Rakusa the Sprachenatelier Berlin

2009

- Nightmare in the fishing boat - Africa and Europe refugees Fisheries Policy
- Martin Rosenplänter with the corresponding consequences
- Reading and discussion with author Hasnain Kazim
- Turkey after the local elections, - still on the road to Europe?

2008

- Quando la mafia non esiste - When the Mafia did not exist
- Presentation of the book "Fragole e Uranio - Strawberries and uranium"
- Reading with Esmahan Aykol the Sprachenatelier Berlin
- August 5, 2008, 19:30 - 15. Aug 2008, 23:30
- Film Screening "100 steps" (orig. "I cento passi") and discussion in Sprachenatelier
- The world is not my village - 3rd Flap

2007

- The world is not my village - 1st Flap
- Exhibition Betty Striker, objects and photographs
- Photo exhibition of Elma Riza
- in movement 2 - Russian short film series
- Japanese Week 2007
- Idiosyntactix "Commodity Production"

2006

- Russian Film Festival in Berlin

2005

- Russian Film Days 2005
- Os Óculos Brasileiros-The Brazilian Glasses

2004

- Polish Art in the Sprachenatelier Berlin - Vernissage

=== Languages ===
At Sprachenatelier Berlin the following languages are taught both in group courses and individual tuition: Albanian, Arabic, Armenian, Bengali, Bulgarian, Catalan, Chinese Danish, German, English, Estonian, Finnish, French, Greek, Georgian, Hebrew, Hindi, Italian, Irish, Icelandic, Japanese, Kiswahili, Korean, Kurdish, Latin, Latvian, Lithuanian, Mongolian, Nepalese, Dutch, Norwegian, Persian, Polish, Romanian, Portuguese, Russian, Slovak, Swedish, Slovenian, Spanish, Serbian / Croatian / Bosnian, Thai, Czech, Turkish, Ukrainian, Hungarian, and Urdu.
