= YKI =

YKI or Yki may refer to:

- YKI test, a Finnish exam in language fluency
- Institute for Surface Chemistry (Swedish: Ytkemiska Institutet), Sweden
- Yorkie (Yki), an enzyme in the Hippo signaling pathway
