= Språkrådet =

Språkrådet may refer to:

- Language Council of Sweden
- Language Council of Norway
