= Spanish nationality law =

Civil Code of Spain Articles 17 to 28

Cortes Generales
- Long title: Royal Decree of 24 July 1889
- Citation: BOE-A-1889-4763
- Territorial extent: Spain
- Enacted by: Cortes Generales
- Enacted: 26 May 1889
- Assented to by: Queen Regent Maria Christina
- Royal assent: 24 July 1889
- Status: Amended

The primary law governing nationality of Spain is Articles 17 to 28 of the Civil Code of Spain, which came into force on 24 July 1889. Spain is a member state of the European Union (EU), and all Spanish nationals are EU citizens. They are entitled to free movement rights in EU and European Free Trade Association (EFTA) countries, and may vote in elections to the European Parliament for the Spain constituency.

Spanish citizenship by origin is defined in the Civil Code on the principle of jus sanguinis (with some limited jus soli provisions) and it can be voluntarily renounced but not forcefully removed. The most common mode of acquisition of derivative citizenship is legal and continuous residence in the country. The Spanish legal framework is considered to be one of the most restrictive in Europe in terms of citizenship acquisition. A preferential treatment in this regard is granted to former colonies, whose citizens also enjoy the privilege of not needing to renounce their original citizenship to acquire the Spanish one.

== History ==
Traditionally, considerations about the Spanish nationality had been (successively) regulated by constitutional articles: the 5th article of the 1812 Cádiz Constitution, 1st article of the 1837 Constitution, 1st Article of the 1845 Constitution, 2nd article of the unpromulgated 1856 Constitution, 1st article of the 1869 Constitution and 1st article of the 1876 Constitution.

The original text of the 1889 Civil Code was partially or wholly amended by the 23rd and 24th articles of the 1931 Constitution (which opened a way for exploring double citizenship agreements with Ibero–American countries), and the 1954, 1975, 1982, 1990, and 2002 laws. The current Constitution of 1978 is the first that does not define Spanish nationality. Rather, article 11 establishes that Spanish nationality is acquired, preserved and lost in accordance with the provisions of the law (Spanish: "la nacionalidad española se adquiere, se conserva y se pierde de acuerdo con lo establecido por la ley"). It is also the first constitution that emphasises that a español de origen ("Spaniard by origin") cannot be deprived of their nationality. On 13 July 1982, and in accordance to what had been established in the constitution, the first law regarding nationality was approved, which was in fact an amendment to the Spanish Civil Code in effect. This law has been reformed on 17 December 1990, 23 December 1993, 2 November 1995, and most recently 2 October 2002.

=== European integration ===
As part of their 1986 enlargement, Spain joined the European Communities (EC), a set of organisations that later developed into the European Union (EU). Spanish citizens have since been able to work in other EC/EU countries under the freedom of movement for workers established by the 1957 Treaty of Rome and participated in their first European Parliament elections in 1987. With the creation of European Union citizenship by the 1992 Maastricht Treaty, free movement rights were extended to all nationals of EU member states regardless of their employment status. The scope of these rights was further expanded with the establishment of the European Economic Area (EEA) in 1994 to include any national of an EFTA member state other than Switzerland, which concluded a separate free movement agreement with the EU that came into force in 2002. Liechtenstein exceptionally maintains immigration controls on EEA/Swiss citizens despite its EEA membership due to its small geographic and population size.

== Acquisition of nationality ==
Spanish legislation regulating nationality makes a distinction between "nationality by origin" and "derivative nationality". Individuals who hold Spanish nationality by origin cannot have that status involuntarily revoked, are eligible to become tutor to the sovereign, and cannot lose Spanish nationality by naturalising as a citizen of a country with which Spain has historic ties (any Ibero-American country, Andorra, the Philippines, Equatorial Guinea, or Portugal).

=== Entitlement by birth, descent, or adoption ===
Any person born to a Spanish parent automatically acquires Spanish nationality by origin, whether they are born within Spain or overseas. Individuals born in the country to two foreign parents acquire Spanish nationality by origin if at least one parent was also born in Spain. Children under age 18 who are adopted by a Spanish national acquire Spanish nationality by origin when the adoption takes legal effect. Before 1990, adopted children only acquired nationality by origin if at least one parent was a Spanish national by origin. Any person born in the country who acquire no nationality at birth and would otherwise be stateless automatically acquire Spanish nationality by origin.

An adoptee over the age of 18 can apply for Spanish nationality by origin up to two years after the adoption.

Since the 1889 Civil Code came into effect, there have been various regulations requiring registration of births of Spaniards abroad, and limiting citizenship by descent to a specified number of generations. These rules have changed over time; the rules in force at the time of birth usually apply.

Under Article 24.1, people born outside Spain, other than in specified Spanish-speaking countries, to a Spanish citizen born in Spain will lose Spanish nationality if they exclusively use a foreign nationality acquired before adulthood. That loss can be avoided by registering the desire to preserve Spanish nationality in the civil registry at a Spanish consulate.

Until a 9 January 2003 change in the law, Spanish citizens born in an Ibero-American country or specific former Spanish territories to a Spanish citizen parent, also born outside of Spain, and who held that other country's citizenship, preserved Spanish citizenship with no retention declaration required. After that date, second generation born abroad Spaniards from the Iberosphere who were not already 18 or in legal majority (adulthood) by that date, and who held the other country's citizenship, are required to declare their intention to retain Spanish nationality to Spanish authorities within three years of majority (until age 21).

The range of Ibero-American countries in which Spanish jus sanguinis will apply to a person of Spanish descent has also changed over time as Spain has signed agreements and treaties with countries.

All other people who acquire Spanish nationality are "Spaniards not by origin".

=== By option ===
Article 20 of the Spanish Civil Code, established that the following individuals have the right to apply (lit. 'to opt') for Spanish nationality:

- those individuals that were under the tutelage of a Spanish citizen,
- those individuals whose father or mother had been originally Spanish and born in Spain (i.e. those individuals who were born after their parent(s) had lost Spanish nationality, or those born with another nationality before 1982 to a Spanish mother).
- those individuals mentioned in the second bullet-point in article 17, and adopted foreigners of 18 years of age or more.

Spanish nationality by option must be claimed within two years after their 18th birthday or after their "emancipation", regardless of age, except for those individuals whose father or mother had been originally Spanish and born in Spain, for which there is no age limit. Spanish nationality by option does not confer "nationality by origin" unless otherwise specified (i.e. those mentioned in article 17, and those who obtained it through the Law of Historical Memory).

=== Naturalization ===
Map showing the Ibero-American Nations

Spanish nationality can be acquired by naturalization, which is only granted at the discretion of the government through a royal decree, and under exceptional circumstances, for example to notable individuals.

Also, any individual can request Spanish nationality after a period of continuous legal residence in Spain, as long as they are 18 years or older, or through a legal representative if they are younger. Under Article 22, to apply for nationality through residence it is necessary for the individual to have legally resided in Spain for:

- ten years, (general period) or
- five years if the individual is a refugee, or
- two years if the individual is a natural-born citizen (nacional de origen) of a country of Ibero-America (including individuals with Puerto Rican citizenship), Portugal, Andorra, the Philippines, Equatorial Guinea, or if the individual can prove they are a Sephardi Jew with a connection to Spain; or
- one year for individuals:
  - born in Spanish territory, or
  - who did not exercise their right to nationality by option within the established period of time, or
  - who have been under the legal tutelage or protection of a Spanish citizen or institution for two consecutive years,
  - who have been married for one year to a Spanish national and are not separated legally or de facto, or
  - are widow(er)s of a Spanish national if at the time of death they were not legally or de facto separated, or
  - who were born outside of Spain, if one of their parents or grandparents was originally Spanish (i.e. Spanish by origin).

In addition to meeting the residence requirement, applicants must pass the DELE and possess at least a level A2 certificate unless the applicant is a citizen of a country where Spanish is an official language, as well as pass a cultural and historical knowledge exam called the CCSE (Conocimientos Constitucionales y Socioculturales de España).

While Spanish law requires an answer before one year of the request, by the end of 2022 there were over 11,000 requests pending for over five years. There were more than 276,000 pending requests. More than 100,000 were overdue.

==== Sephardi Jews ====
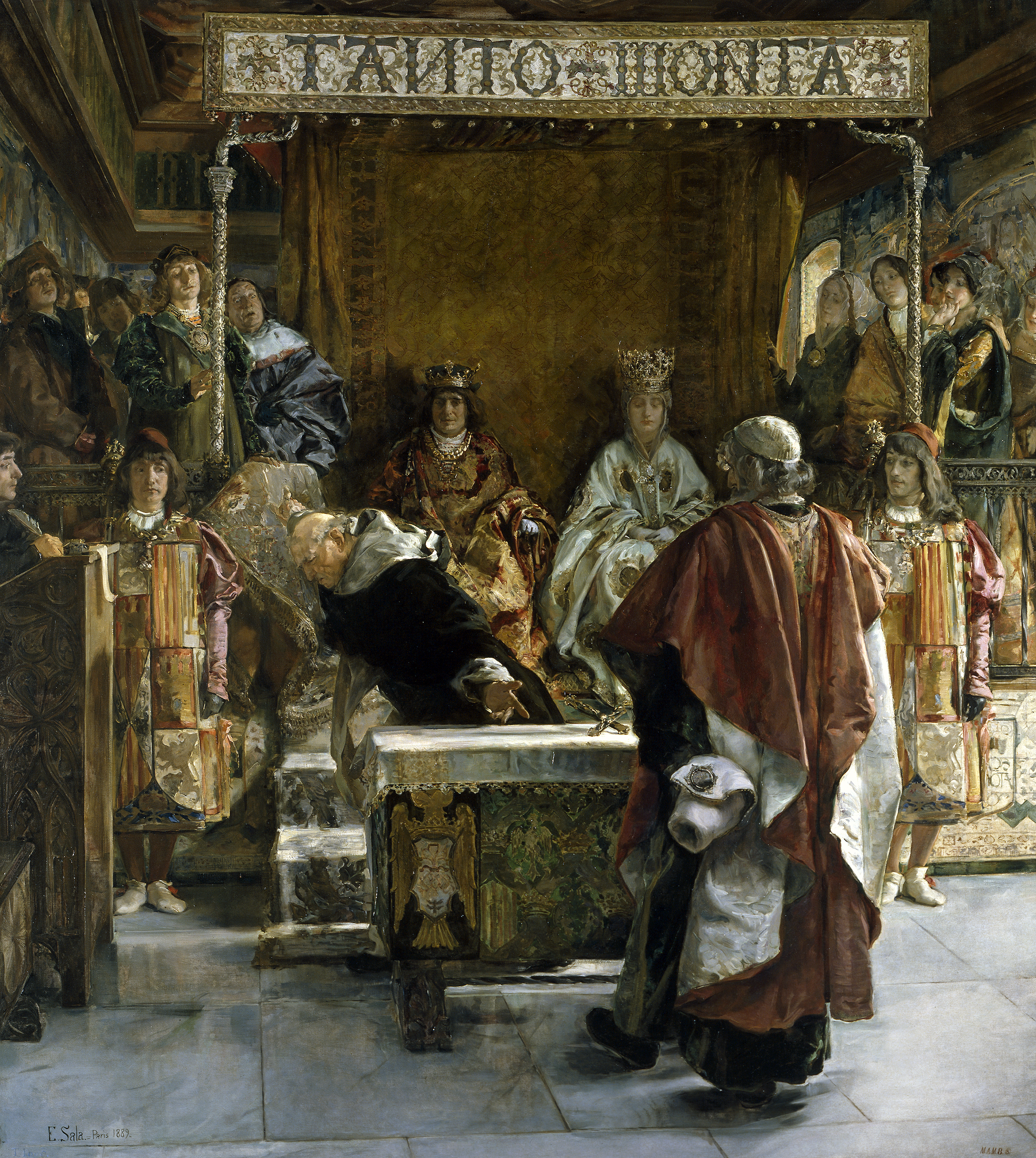
The Expulsion of the Jews from Spain (in the year 1492) by Emilio Sala Francés

In 2015 the Government of Spain passed Law 12/2015 of 24 June, whereby the descendants of Sephardi Jews of Spanish origin could obtain Spanish nationality by naturalisation, without the residency requirement as explained above. The law required applicants to apply for citizenship within three years from 1 October 2015, provide evidence of their Sephardi origin, demonstrate a special connection with Spain, and pass examinations on the Spanish language and Spanish culture and institutions. To provide proof of Sephardic descent, applicants could obtain Sephardic heritage certificates from organizations such as the Federation of Jewish Communities of Spain. The law provided for a possible one-year extension of the deadline to 1 October 2019; it was indeed extended in March 2018. The deadline for completing the requirements was extended until September 2021 due to delays due to the COVID-19 pandemic, but only for those who had made a preliminary application by 1 October 2019. This path to citizenship is in restitution for the 1492 expulsion of the Jews from Spain.

The Law establishes the right to Spanish nationality of Sephardi Jews with a connection to Spain. An Instruction of 29 September 2015 removes a provision whereby those acquiring Spanish nationality by law 12/2015 must renounce any other nationality held. Most applicants must have passed a test of Spanish language proficiency (DELE) and a test of knowledge of Spanish culture and institutions (CCSE), but those who were under 18, or handicapped, were exempted. A Resolution in May 2017 also exempted those aged over 70.

By July 2017 the government of Spain had registered about 4,300 applicants who had begun the process, and about 1,000 had signed before a notary public and filed their documents officially. A hundred, from various countries, had been granted citizenship, with another 400 expected within weeks. The Spanish government was then taking 8–10 months to decide on each case. After 2017, it would take 1–2 years to resolve a complete application. By March 2018 over 6,200 people had been granted Spanish citizenship under this law. And by the end of 2019, a total of about 132,000 applications were received, 67,000 of them in the month before the 30 September 2019 deadline.

== Loss and recovery of Spanish nationality ==
Spanish nationality can be lost under the following circumstances:

- Those individuals of 18 years of age or more whose residence is not Spain and who acquire voluntarily another nationality, or who use exclusively another nationality which was conferred to them prior to their age of emancipation lose Spanish nationality. In this case, loss of nationality occurs three years after the acquisition of the foreign nationality or emancipation only if the individual does not declare their will to retain Spanish nationality. The exception to this are those Spaniards by origin who acquire the nationality of an Iberoamerican country, Andorra, Philippines, Equatorial Guinea or Portugal;
- Those Spanish nationals that expressly renounce Spanish nationality if they also possess another nationality and reside outside Spain will lose Spanish nationality;
- Those minors born outside Spain that have acquired Spanish citizenship being children of Spanish nationals that were also born outside Spain, and if the laws of the country in which they live grant them another nationality, will lose Spanish nationality if they do not declare their will to retain it within three years after their 18th birthday or the date of their emancipation.

The Civil Code regulations on loss of citizenship, and the reasons for it—including lack of registration with Spanish consular authorities overseas—and the practical application of those regulations, has varied over time.

Spanish nationality is not lost as described above if Spain is at war.

In addition, Spaniards "not by origin", will lose their nationality if:

- they use exclusively for a period of three years their previous nationality—with the exception of the nationality of those countries with which Spain has signed an agreement of dual nationality;
- they participate voluntarily in the army of a foreign country, or serve in public office in a foreign government, against the specific prohibition of the Spanish Government;
- they had lied or committed fraud when they applied for Spanish nationality.

People who lose Spanish nationality can recover it if they become legal residents in Spain. Emigrants and their children are not required to return to Spain to recover their Spanish nationality. (Since the nationality law automatically grants Spanish nationality to people born of a Spanish parent, a person born outside Spain to a parent of Spanish birth and nationality who uses the citizenship of the other country exclusively since birth is said to "recover" their Spanish nationality should they apply for it).

=== Descendants of political exiles ===
==== 2007 Law of Historical Memory ====
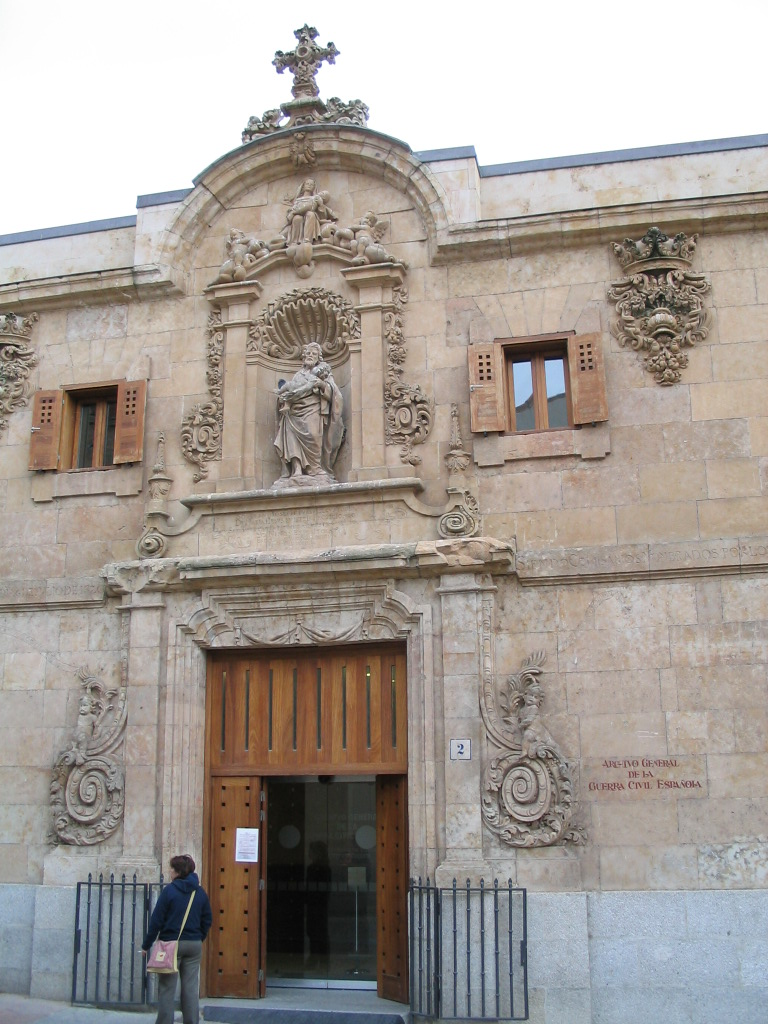
Headquarters of the General Archive of the Civil War, which will be merged into the Archive of Historical Memory or Centro Documental de la Memoria Histórica .

In 2007, the Congress of Deputies, under the government of prime minister José Luis Rodríguez Zapatero, approved the Law of Historical Memory with the aim of recognising the rights of those who suffered persecution or violence during the Spanish Civil War (1936-1939), and the dictatorial regime that followed (1939-1975). In recognition of the "injustice produced by the exile" of thousands of Spaniards, the law allowed their descendants to obtain Spanish nationality by origin, specifically for:

- those individuals born of a parent that was Spanish by origin, regardless of the place of birth of the parent, whatever the age of the applicant. (The Spanish Civil code currently grants Spanish nationality "by origin" only to those individuals born of a person that held Spanish nationality at the time of birth, and Spanish nationality "not by origin" to those individuals born of former Spanish nationals that were born in Spain or that acquired Spanish nationality after the birth of the child but before the child turned 18. In the latter case, the child has until his 20th birthday to request citizenship); and
- those individuals whose grandfather or grandmother had been exiled because of the Spanish Civil War, and had lost his or her Spanish nationality. In this case the applicant must have proven that the grandparent had left Spain as a refugee or that the grandparent left Spain between 18 July 1936 and 31 December 1955.

The law also granted Spanish nationality by origin to those foreign individual members of the International Brigades who had defended the Second Spanish Republic in the Spanish Civil War. (In 1996, they were granted Spanish nationality "not by origin", which implied that they had to renounce their previous nationality—Spanish nationals "by origin" cannot be deprived of their nationality, and therefore, these individuals can also retain their original nationality).

By virtue of this law, if an individual, whose father or mother had been originally Spanish and born in Spain, and who had previously acquired Spanish nationality "not by origin" by option (art. 20) could request his or her nationality be changed to nationality "by origin", if he or she chose to do so.

Spanish nationality could be acquired by the Law of Historical memory from on 27 December 2008 until 26 December 2011; 446,277 people had applied by 30 November 2011. Around 95% were Latin American, half of them from Cuba and Argentina. To the surprise of government officials, 92.5% of all applications were made by sons or daughters of Spaniards by origin regardless of their place of birth, and only 6.1% by grandchildren of refugees.

Many applications under the law came from Cuba, which also offered those Cubans an ability to leave the island, and to also live and work in EU countries other than Spain.

==== 2022 Democratic Memory Law ====
The Democratic Memory Law, which passed the upper house of parliament on 5 October 2022, and came into effect on 21 October 2022, offered Spanish citizenship to the children of Spanish exiles who had fled from the regime. The 2007 Historical Memory Law had excluded children of exiles who had changed or renounced their Spanish citizenship; the new law entitled any descendant of Spanish immigrants born before 1985 – the year Spain changed its nationality law – to citizenship. This now included the grandchildren of people exiled under the Franco dictatorship, and the descendants of women who had lost their citizenship on marrying non-Spaniards. It is estimated that 700,000 people could be eligible for citizenship under the new "grandchildren law".

=== Sahrawis born in Spanish Sahara ===
On 10 September 2026, the Congress of Deputies passed a law setting a path for, under exceptional circumstances, granting citizenship by naturalization to Sahrawis born in Western Sahara before 29 September 1977 (in addition to their direct descendants), even if they do not legally reside in Spain, providing evidence of that condition by means of an old Spanish national ID card, the receipt of registration on the voter roll for the Western Sahara referendum, certified by the United Nations; birth certificates; or documents issued by the Spanish government. The approved text will subsequently pass through the legislative process in the Senate.

== Dual citizenship ==
Dual citizenship is permitted for all Spaniards. Spaniards by origin automatically retain Spanish nationality when acquiring citizenship from Ibero-American countries, Andorra, the Philippines, Equatorial Guinea, or Portugal. For all other nationalities, they must declare their will to retain Spanish nationality within three years. Naturalized Spaniards can also retain Spanish nationality upon acquiring another nationality, but they must always make this declaration within three years, regardless of the country involved. Failure to do so results in the loss of Spanish nationality.

Foreign nationals who acquire Spanish nationality must renounce their previous nationality, unless they are natural-born citizens of a Latin American country, Andorra, the Philippines, Equatorial Guinea, or Portugal.

Since October 2002, dual citizens of Spain and another country who are born outside Spain to a Spanish citizen parent born outside Spain must declare to conserve their Spanish nationality between ages 18 and 21.
