= Teastas Eorpach na Gaeilge =

Examinations for adult learners of Irish

Teastas Eorpach na Gaeilge (TEG) or European Certificate in Irish is a set of examinations for adult learners of Irish. TEG is linked to the Common European Framework of Reference for Languages (Council of Europe, 2001). It examines four skills: speaking, listening, reading and writing. Examinations are currently available at five levels from Beginners 1 (A1) to Advanced 1 (C1) and are run internationally. In 2016 exams were held in Sydney, New York, Ottawa, and nationally in Ireland. There is the option for candidates at all levels to undertake the full examination (Lánchreidiúint) or just the oral examination (partial credit).

TEG is the first certification system for adult learners of Irish connected with the ALTE (Association of Language Testers in Europe) examination system and the Council of Europe. Such a system had already been developed for most other European languages. This system helps learners to plan their studies and gain recognition for the progress they have made. Another advantage of the system is that it gives educational institutions and employers a guide to the language ability of candidates applying for courses, jobs or promotions. In Ireland this makes it of particular relevance to the provisions of the Official Languages Act 2003. The Language Centre in Maynooth is a member of ALTE and monitors the content and quality of TEG.
