= Google (verb) =

Transitive verb, to search using Google

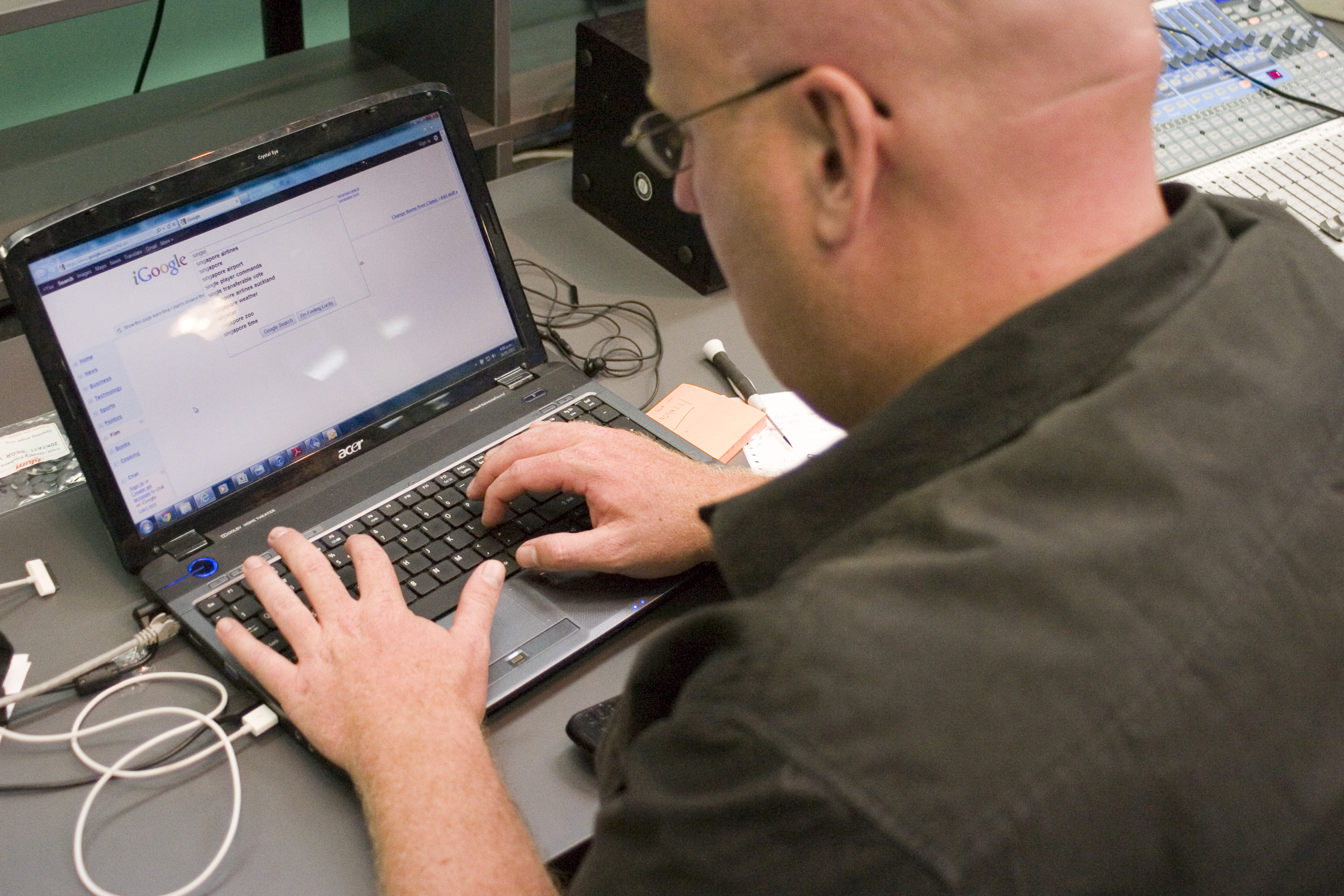
The act of using an online search engine is known colloquially as googling.

Owing to the dominance of the Google search engine, to google has become a transitive verb. The neologism commonly refers to searching for information on the World Wide Web, typically using the Google search engine, but not necessarily. People online often refer to this as "searching the web". The American Dialect Society chose it as the "most useful word of 2002". It was added to the Oxford English Dictionary on June 15, 2006, and to the eleventh edition of the Merriam-Webster Collegiate Dictionary in July 2006.

== Etymology ==
The first recorded usage of google was as a gerund, on July 8, 1998, by Google co-founder Larry Page himself, who wrote on a mailing list: "Have fun and keep googling!". Its earliest known use as an explicitly transitive verb was in 2000. It began appearing in newspapers in 2001 and eventually made its way to American television in the "Help" episode of Buffy the Vampire Slayer (October 15, 2002), when Willow asked Buffy, "Have you googled her yet?".

To prevent genericizing and potential loss of its trademark, Google has discouraged use of the word as a verb, particularly when used as a synonym for general web searching. On February 23, 2003, Google sent a cease and desist letter to Paul McFedries, creator of Word Spy, a website that tracks neologisms. In an article in The Washington Post, Frank Ahrens discussed the letter he received from a Google lawyer that demonstrated "appropriate" and "inappropriate" ways to use the verb "google".

It was reported that, in response to this concern, lexicographers for the Merriam-Webster Collegiate Dictionary turned to lowercase the actual entry of the word, google. They maintained the capitalization of the search engine in their definition, "to use the Google search engine to seek online information" (a concern which did not deter the Oxford editors from preserving the history of both "cases"). On October 25, 2006, Google sent a request to the public requesting that "You should please only use 'Google' when you're actually referring to Google Inc. and our services."

Ungoogleable means it is something that cannot be "googled" – that is, it cannot be easily found using a web search engine, especially Google.

== Non-English usage ==
In 2013, the Swedish Language Council attempted to include the Swedish version of the word ungoogleable (ogooglebar) in its list of new words, but Google objected to the definition not being specifically related to Google, and the council was forced to remove it immediately to avoid a legal confrontation with Google.

Some Spanish speakers use the term googlear ('to google'). The Royal Spanish Academy recognizes the term as hybrid word using the English company name and Spanish verb ending -ear, but advises the spelling guglear and states that buscar en Google ('search on Google') is ultimately the most normal phrasing.

== See also ==
- grep § Usage as a verb
- Photoshop (verb), a similar neologism referring to digital photo editing
