= Certificate Examinations in Polish as a Foreign Language =

Standardized tests of Polish language proficiency

The Certificate Examinations in Polish as a Foreign Language (Polish: Egzaminy Certyfikatowe z Języka Polskiego jako Obcego), also referred as State Certificate Examinations in Polish as a Foreign Language (Polish: Państwowe Egzaminy Certyfikatowe z Języka Polskiego jako Obcego), are standardized tests of Polish language proficiency for non-native Polish speakers. The examinations are held by the State Commission for the Certification of Proficiency in Polish as a Foreign Language (Polish: Państwowa Komisja Poświadczania Znajomości Języka Polskiego jako Obcego) starting from 2004 in Poland as well as in foreign countries. Candidates passing the examinations would obtain a certificate indicating the level of their proficiency in Polish. Through 2015, only three levels of examinations set according to the Common European Framework of Reference for Languages were available, namely, B1, B2 and C2. Following reforms initiated that year, certification is available for levels A1-C2 for adults and A1-B2 for children

This is the only state document that could confirm one's proficiency in Polish.

== History ==
On 3 July 2003, pursuant to the Language Act, the State Commission for the Certification of Proficiency in Polish as a Foreign Language was established by the Minister of Education, with the aim to setting up a certificate examination for Polish as a foreign language.

The examination was first organized in 2004 in both Poland and abroad.

The standards of examination and rules of procedure are based on the guidelines of the Council of Europe, with the aim of standardizing foreign language proficiency tests across Europe. In 2008, Association of Language Testers in Europe (ALTE) audited the examinations and confirm that they are run according to the guidelines.

== Aim ==
The chief aim of the examinations is to determine candidates’ level of proficiency in Polish regardless of the institution and location the candidates learn Polish and the adopted curriculum, educational materials and methods of the candidates.

== Organization ==
The examinations are organized by State Commission for the Certification of Proficiency in Polish as a Foreign Language, which is composed of representatives from major teaching centers teaching Polish as a foreign language. The commission is responsible for setting dates of examinations, appointing examination boards members, developing examinations materials, monitoring examination and issuing certificates to those who have passed the tests.

Examinations are staged at least three times a year in spring, summer and autumn. Currently, only three levels of examination are available. Candidates can sit for the basic (B1), general intermediate (B2) or advanced (C2) examination, the level of which are set according to the Common European Framework of Reference for Languages. The state certificate commission is working on the introduction of the remaining levels of examinations.

== Requirements of sitting for the exams ==
All foreigners and Polish citizens permanently residing abroad may sit for the examination, except that candidates taking the B1 and B2 examinations must be at least 16 years old and those who sit for the C2 examination must age 18 or above.

Candidates having special needs can also apply for the examinations, and special adjustments of form of the examination, like extending the time of examinations or using specialized equipment and technical devices, could be arranged.

== Application ==
Registration forms could be sent on-line, by fax or mail. A letter of confirmation would be sent to the candidate after the application form has been received. The examination would be staged if there are at least twenty candidates applying to sit the examination at a particular examination center. Examination fees should be paid on or before the deadline shown on the letter of confirmation by bank transfer.

Information about the date and time of the examination would be sent to candidates by e-mail as well as mail.

The examination fees are €150 (B1/B2) and €180 (C1/C2) respectively. Successful candidates need to pay an additional €20 for their certificate.

== Examination ==
The examination consists of five sub-tests, divided into two parts, i.e. a written part and an oral part. At all levels, the structure of the written part is the same, varying only in terms of difficulty. The written part comprises Listening Comprehension (Part A), Accuracy/Grammar in Use (Part B), Reading Comprehension (Part C) and Writing (Part D), whereas the oral examination tests only Oral Communication (Part E).

Sub-test	Tasks	Duration	Total duration
Listening Comprehension (Part A)	Candidates have to complete four to five tasks. They listen to a recording once or twice and they complete the tasks while listening. They tick correct answers or fill in gaps in a text or answer text related questions. An examiner puts on a CD or a tape at the beginning of the test and switches it off when the recording is over. The examiner is not allowed to give any instructions during the test. All necessary information on the examination procedure and rules of conduct is included in the recording.	30 minutes	225 minutes
Accuracy/Grammar in Use (Part B)	This part of the examination consists of eight to ten tasks. Candidates, in order to complete these tasks, have to identify the correct form and tick the right answer (multiple choice items) or write down an appropriate grammatical form. The main aim of this part of the examination is to assess the practical usage of grammatical structures. This is why these tasks usually have the form of short texts which are logically coherent.	60 minutes	225 minutes
Reading Comprehension (Part C)	Candidates have to complete four to five tasks. In order to do that, they should read texts carefully (texts may have a form of single sentences or paragraphs or may be longer) and mark or give an appropriate answer to questions related to these texts. These tasks check the candidates’ competences regarding reading for gist (skimming) and for specific information (scanning).	45 minutes	225 minutes
Writing (Part D)	In this part of the examination, candidates are asked to choose one out of three or four sets of tasks and write texts in accordance with a test instruction. Topics are formulated in such a way that they do not require any specialist knowledge from candidates. The main aim of this sub-test is to assess candidates’ writing skills and not their knowledge in a given subject area.	90 minutes	225 minutes

The oral part of the examinations is carried out on the same day or on the next day of the written examinations. Candidates need to make oral statements based on different written and graphic materials. Candidates have to draw one out of three sets of materials in order to determine which set of task they are required to complete. The tasks and duration of the oral part are different for different levels.

Level	Tasks	Preparation time	Examination time
Basic (B1)	Task A: Describing a photo (scene presented on a photo); Task B: Monologue (speaking on a given topic); Task C: Situational dialogue	3 minutes	About 15 minutes
General Intermediate (B2)	Task A: Describing a set of visual materials; Task B: Expressing opinions about a text; Task C: Monologue (speaking on a given topic).	7 minutes	About 15 minutes
Advanced (C2)	Task A: A short presentation based on graphic or written materials designed to elicit response from the candidate (prompts); Task B: Summarizing a text and expressing opinions about it.	10 minutes	About 15 minutes

== Assessment ==
Examinations are assessed by examination commissions appointed by the State Commission for the Certification of Proficiency in Polish as a Foreign Language.

Each examination consists of five sub-tests of equal value, with each of the sub-test bearing a maximum of 40 points. The maximum points of the examination is thus 200. In order to pass the examination, a candidate has to score at least 60% of points, i.e. 24 points, in each of five sub-tests.

Every sub-test is assessed by two markers, who check against:

- Task completion (content, length, form, composition)
- Grammar accuracy
- Vocabulary
- Register
- Spelling and punctuation
- Pronunciation and fluency (only for Part E)

Each marker can give a maximum 20 points, and hence the maximum points for the examinations are 200.

While the marking criteria in Part A, B and C are relatively objective, the marking for writing and oral expression is more subjective. Unavoidable though it is, subjectivity in these sub-tests is limited by the standardization of assessment criteria, double rating and training of examiners.

Examination marks are awarded according to the following scale:

Grade	Points	Percentage
Excellent	189.6 – 200 points	94.8% – 100%
Very Good	169.6 – 189.5 points	84.8% – 94.75%
Good	149.6 – 169.5 points	74.8% – 84.75%
Satisfactory	120 – 149.5 points	60% – 74.75%
Fail	0 – 119 points	0 – 59.5%

Failed candidates may re-take the examination at the same level after one year. Or, if they find it appropriate, they may launch an appeal to the Commission. Upon the candidate’s request the President of the Commission may allow him to review, in his presence, relevant sub-tests assessed by the examination board.

== Certificate ==
After six weeks of the examination, the candidates would receive notification about their results. Those who have passed need to pay an extra €20 for the certificate, and the Commission would issue the certificate upon receiving the payment. Candidates would receive their certificate by registered mail.

The certificate is with supplement in English with a detailed description of the results.

== Benefits of obtaining the certificate ==
According to the provisions of the Regulation of the Minister of Science and Higher Education of 12 October 2006 on taking up and carrying out studies by foreigners, foreign students should have passed the B2 Certificate Examinations in Polish as a Foreign Language in order to be able to study in a Polish school or university, where teaching activities are conducted in Polish. The requirement is looser for artistic and sports-related disciplines (e.g. music, arts, physical education studies) and a B1 basic proficiency in Polish is enough for these subjects.

Besides education, the certificates may also be useful in certain job areas. For instance, the Ministry for Infrastructure, before granting a license for conducting real estate business, requires the submission of a certificate in Polish as a foreign language at C2 level. Employees in health sector would also need to prove their language proficiency — the Chambers of Nurses in Poland require foreigners employed by Polish hospitals and medical centres to have a certificate in Polish as a foreign language at B1 level. According to the Regulation on Civil Service, foreigners applying for jobs in civil service are also required to provide a certificate in Polish as a foreign language at B2 level.

The certificate is gaining popularity among the upper-secondary students in several countries, notably in Germany and the United States. In some countries, the certificate can serve as a document certifying the command of an additional foreign language, which entitles students to obtain additional points during a matriculation examination.
