= Language Council of Sweden =

Swedish government agency for language policy

The Language Council of Sweden (Swedish: Språkrådet) is the primary regulatory body for the advancement and cultivation of the Swedish language. The council is a department of the Swedish government's Institute for Language and Folklore (Swedish: Institutet för språk och folkminnen). The council asserts control over the language through the publication of various books with recommendations in spelling and grammar as well as books on linguistics intended for a general audience, the sales of which are used to fund its operation. The council also works with four of the five official minority languages in Sweden: Finnish, Meänkieli, Yiddish, and Romani (Sámi excluded) alongside the Swedish Sign Language.

Between 1965 and 2007, the council published the quarterly journal Språkvård (lit. "Language care"). The journal published articles about the use and development of the Swedish language, Q&As about spelling and grammar as well as guidelines for the use of Swedish in various contexts.

== History ==
The Language Council of Sweden has its roots in the attempt to assert control over the official language use among the Nordic countries. The first ideas of a joint Nordic project surfaced in the 1930s and resulted in a Danish organization for Nordic language cultivation being founded in 1941. The idea of an all-Nordic cooperation was thwarted by the fact that all Nordic countries with the exception of Sweden were embroiled in the Second World War. On 3 March 1944 a group of 16 organizations held the first constituent assembly for what was then called Nämnden för svensk språkvård ("The Committee for Swedish Language Cultivation").

To counter difficulties in its finances, the council was reorganized in 1973 and assumed the name Svenska språknämnden ("The Swedish Language Committee"). The government also assured the future of the council by guaranteeing the financing of four permanent staff members; a figure which later grew and was no longer limited to a certain number of members, but by the actual needs of the council. Since the government assumed the responsibility for the financing, it also has the right to appoint the chairman and the head of the secretariat.

The council assumed its current name (Språkrådet; "The Language Council") in 2006, as it became a department of the state agency the Institute for Language and Folklore.

Ogooglebar (from o- prefix (negative prefix) + googlebar (google + -bar suffix (-able))) is a word, in Swedish, that the Language Council of Sweden has been forced to remove from its top 10 list of new words by a claim of brand protection from Google. The word is translated as (and also when translated literally means) ungoogleable. The council expressed its "displeasure with Google's attempts to control the language".

== See also ==
- Language policy
- Research Institute for the Languages of Finland
- Dansk Sprognævn
- Norwegian Language Council
- Swedish as a foreign language
- Swedish Academy
- Swedish Broadcasting Corporation
