= Simtest =

Language proficiency test

SIMTEST is a computerized adaptive test (CAT) of foreign language ability designed and developed at the Universitat Autònoma de Barcelona in Catalonia, Spain. It classifies examinees according to 6 levels of proficiency as defined in the Council of Europe document: “A Common European Framework of Reference for Languages (CEFR): learning, teaching, assessment” (Cambridge University Press, 2001).

SIMTEST has been developed for both placement and certification purposes. Version 1 was available in local for Windows and current version is available on-line. It consists of 4 component tests that may be used - according to the testing context or institutional requirements - to test knowledge of vocabulary, grammar and language functions in addition to reading and listening comprehension. The only non-CAT component consists of a series of 4 C-Tests (a cloze procedure developed in the 1980s at Gerhard-Mercator-Universität Duisburg in Germany - based on theories of language redundancy relating to Gestalt theory). An initial estimation of the level of language proficiency detected by the C-Tests may be used as an entry point to the CAT components. Multiple choice items are presented on a CAT administration based on an algorithm described by Henning (1987).
