= Certificate of Galician Studies =

Galician language proficiency test

The Certificate of Galician Studies (CELGA) (Galician: Certificado de Estudos de Lingua Galega) is a standardised proficiency test for the Galician language. The various levels of the CELGA (1–5) align with Common European Framework of Reference levels (A2–C2). 3,863 people took the CELGA exam in 2012. It is organised by la Secretaría General de Política Lingüística, a part of the Galician government. The CELGA exam was founded in 2007 in accordance with the criteria of the Association of Language Testers in Europe, a group that tests language ability.

== Levels ==
- CELGA 1: A2 – Able to express oneself very basically.
- CELGA 2: B1 – Can relatively effectively communicate in a variety of situations.
- CELGA 3: B2 – Able to talk effectively about a wide variety of subjects.
- CELGA 4: C1 – Can speak fluently and spontaneously in the majority of cases.
- CELGA 5: C2 – Can speak without difficulty and can communicate without any problem in formal and informal situations.
