= Common European Framework of Reference for Languages =

Language assessment rubric

The Common European Framework of Reference for Languages: Learning, Teaching, Assessment, abbreviated in English as CEFR, CEF, or CEFRL, is a guideline used to describe achievements of learners of foreign languages across Europe and, increasingly, in other countries. The CEFR is also intended to make it easier for educational institutions and employers to evaluate the language qualifications of candidates for education admission or employment. Its main aim is to provide a method of teaching, and assessing that applies to all languages in Europe.

The CEFR was established by the Council of Europe between 1986 and 1989 as part of the "Language Learning for European Citizenship" project. In November 2001, a European Union Council Resolution recommended using the CEFR to set up systems of validation of language ability. The six reference levels (A1, A2, B1, B2, C1, C2) are becoming widely accepted as the European standard for grading an individual's language proficiency.

As of 2024, "localized" versions of the CEFR exist in Japan, Vietnam, Thailand, Malaysia, and Mexico, with the Malaysian government writing that "CEFR is a suitable and credible benchmark for English standards in Malaysia."

== Development ==
An intergovernmental symposium in 1991 titled "Transparency and Coherence in Language Learning in Europe: Objectives, Evaluation, Certification" held by the Swiss Federal Authorities in the Swiss municipality of Rüschlikon found the need for a common European framework for languages to improve the recognition of language qualifications and help teachers co-operate. A project followed to develop language-level classifications for certification to be recognised across Europe.

A preliminary version of the Manual for Relating Language Examinations to the Common European Framework of Reference for Languages (CEFR) was published in 2003. This draft version was piloted in a number of projects, which included linking a single test to the CEFR, linking suites of exams at different levels and national studies by exam boards and research institutes. Practitioners and academics shared their experiences at a colloquium in Cambridge in 2007 and the pilot case studies and findings were published in Studies in Language Testing (SiLT). The findings from the pilot projects then informed the Manual revision project from 2008 to 2009.

The Council of Europe's authoring team emphasized that the CEFR was not written primarily as a framework for assessment and test development. (Note: "As the subtitle 'learning, teaching, assessment' makes clear, the CEFR is not just an assessment project. CEFR 2001 Chapter 9 outlines many different approaches to assessment, most of which are alternatives to standardised tests. It explains ways in which the CEFR in general, and its illustrative descriptors in particular, can be helpful to the teacher in the assessment process, but there is no focus on language testing and no mention at all of test items." (Council of Europe 2020: 289).) Similarly, linguists such as Alderson, Quetz and others criticized the lack of system in the descriptors and the context-free nature of these. Other critics invoked the danger of a rigid "pan-European" language testing system. Brian North, one of the authors of the CEFR team, addressed such criticisms in a Guardian article in 2004:

The Council of Europe (COE) fully respects the diversity of educational and assessment systems in its 45 member states. It does not and could not promote "a shared language testing system", as one misguided commentator was cited as claiming in Dr Fulcher's article.

— The Guardian, 15 April 2004

== Theoretical background ==
The CEFR divides general competences in knowledge, skills, and existential competence with particular communicative competences in linguistic competence, sociolinguistic competence and pragmatic competence. This division does not exactly match previously well-known notions of communicative competence, but correspondences among them can be made.

The CEFR has three principal dimensions: language activities, the domains in which the language activities occur, and the competencies on which a person draws when they engage in them.

=== Language activities ===
The CEFR distinguishes four kinds of language activities: reception (listening and reading), production (spoken and written), interaction (spoken and written) and mediation (translating and interpreting).

=== Domains ===
General and particular communicative competencies are developed by producing or receiving texts in various contexts under various conditions and constraints. These contexts correspond to various sectors of social that the CEFR calls domains. Four broad domains are distinguished: educational, occupational, public and personal. These largely correspond to register.

=== Competencies ===
A language user can develop various degrees of competence in each of these domains and to help describe them, the CEFR has provided a set of six Common Reference Levels (A1, A2, B1, B2, C1, C2).

== Common reference levels ==
The Common European Framework divides learners into three broad divisions that can each be further divided into two levels; for each level, it describes what a learner is supposed to be able to do in listening, reading, writing and speaking.

CEFR Level		Description
C Proficient user	C2	Can understand with ease virtually everything heard or read.; Can summarise information from different spoken and written sources, reconstructing arguments and accounts in a coherent presentation.; Can express themselves spontaneously, very fluently and precisely, differentiating finer shades of meaning even in the most complex situations.
C Proficient user	C1	Can understand a wide range of demanding, longer clauses and recognise implicit meaning.; Can express ideas fluently and spontaneously without much obvious searching for expressions.; Can use language flexibly and effectively for social, academic and professional purposes.; Can produce clear, well-structured, detailed text on complex subjects, showing controlled use of organisational patterns, connectors and cohesive devices.
B Independent user	B2	Can understand the main ideas of complex text on both concrete and abstract topics, including technical discussions in their field of specialisation.; Can interact with a degree of fluency and spontaneity that makes regular interaction with native speakers quite possible without strain for either party.; Can produce clear, detailed text on a wide range of subjects and explain a viewpoint on a topical issue giving the advantages and disadvantages of various options.
B Independent user	B1	Can understand the main points of clear standard input on familiar matters regularly encountered in work, school, leisure, etc.; Can deal with most situations likely to arise while travelling in an area where the language is spoken.; Can produce simple connected text on topics that are familiar or of personal interest.; Can describe experiences and events, dreams, hopes and ambitions and briefly give reasons and explanations for opinions and plans.
A Basic user	A2	Can understand sentences and frequently used expressions related to areas of most immediate relevance (e.g. very basic personal and family information, shopping, local geography, employment).; Can communicate in simple and routine tasks requiring a simple and direct exchange of information on familiar and routine matters.; Can describe in simple terms aspects of their background, immediate environment and matters in areas of immediate need.
A Basic user	A1	Can understand and use familiar everyday expressions and very basic phrases aimed at the satisfaction of needs of a concrete type.; Can introduce themselves to others and can ask and answer questions about personal details such as where they live, people they know and things they have.; Can interact in a simple way provided the other person talks slowly and clearly and is prepared to help.

These descriptors can apply to any of the languages spoken in Europe and there are translations in many languages.

== Relationship with duration of learning process ==
Educational bodies for various languages have offered estimates for the amount of study needed to reach levels in the relevant language. This assumes learners with European languages as their native language, the typical profile within the European Union.

Body	Language	Cumulative hours of instruction to reach the level					
Body	Language	A1	A2	B1	B2	C1	C2
Goethe-Institut	German	60–150	150–260	260–490	450–600	600–750	750+
Alliance française	French	60–100	160–200	360–400	560–650	810–950	1,060–1,200
Cambridge Assessment	English	90–100	180–200	350–400	500–600	700–800	1,000–1,200

== Certification and teaching ecosystem enabled by the CEFR ==
Multiple organisations have been created to serve as an umbrella for language schools and certification businesses that claim compatibility with the CEFR. For example, the European Association for Language Testing and Assessment (EALTA) is an initiative funded by the European Community to promote the CEFR and best practices in delivering professional language training. The Association of Language Testers in Europe (ALTE) is a consortium of academic organisations that aims at standardising assessment methods. Eaquals (Evaluation and Accreditation of Quality in Language Services) is an international association of institutions and organisations involved in language education, active throughout Europe and following the CEFR.

In France, the Ministry for Education has created a government-mandated certificate called CLES, which formalises the use of the CEFR in language teaching programmes in French higher education institutions.

In Germany, Telc, a non-profit agency, is the federal government's exclusive partner for language tests taken at the end of the integration courses for migrants, following the CEFR standards.

== Comparisons with other scales ==
=== General scales ===
==== ACTFL ====
The American Council on the Teaching of Foreign Languages has published a one-directional alignment table of levels according to its ACTFL Proficiency Guidelines and the CEFR levels. It is based on the work of the ACTFL-CEFR Alignment Conferences that started in 2010. Generally, the ACTFL is stricter with regard to receptive skills than productive skills, compared to the CEFR. The following table may not be read as an indication of what ACTFL level follows from taking a CEFR-aligned test.

For convenience, the following abbreviations will be used for the ACTFL levels:

- NL/NM/NH – Novice Low/Mid/High
- IL/IM/IH – Intermediate Low/Mid/High
- AL/AM/AH – Advanced Low/Mid/High
- S – Superior
- D – Distinguished

ACTFL	Correspondence with CEFR
0, NL, NM	0
NH, IL	A1
IM	A2
IH, AL	B1
AM	B2
AH, S	C1
D	C2

Similar correspondence has been proposed for the other direction (test aligned to CEFR) in a panel discussion at the Osaka University of Foreign Studies by one of the coauthors of the CEFR, Brian North. He stated that a "sensible hypothesis" would be for C2 to correspond to "Distinguished," C1 to "Superior," B2 to "Advanced-mid" and B1 to "Intermediate-high" in the ACTFL system. (Note: A reference of the talk can be found in the EP Bibliography of "English Profile", under "General materials" and then under North 2006, Link to English Profile (Bibliography))

This agrees with a table published by the American University Center of Provence giving the following correspondences according to "estimated equivalencies by certified ACTFL administrator":

CEFR	ACTFL
A1	NL, NM, NH
A2	IL, IM
B1	IH
B2	AL, AM, AH
C1	S
C2	D

The following table summarises three earlier proposed equivalences between CEFR and ACTFL. Some of them only refer to one activity (e.g., speaking).

CEFR	Correspondence with ACTFL		
CEFR	Martínez, 2008	Tschirner, 2005 (Note: Tschirner, Erwin (February 2005). "Das ACTFL OPI und der Europäische Referenzrahmen" (PDF). Babylonia (in German). Archived from the original (PDF) on 13 March 2006. Also quoted in Baztán 2008, p. 468)	Buitrago, 2006 (Note: Buitrago (unpublished, 2006) as quoted in Baztán 2008, pp. 469–70)
A1	NL, NM		
A1	NH	NH	NL
A2	IL, IM	IM	NM
B1	IM, IH	IH	IL
B2	IH, AL	AM	IM, IH
C1	AM, AH	AH	AL, AM, AH
C2	AH, S	S	S

==== ILR ====
The Chartered Institute of Linguists presents the following equivalence:

CEFR	ILR
A1	0/0+
A2	1/1+
B1	2/2+
B2	3/3+
C1	4/4+
C2	5

A study by Buck, Papageorgiou and Platzek addresses the correspondence between the difficulty of test items under the CEFR and ILR standards. The most common ILR levels for items of given CEFR difficulty were as follows:

- Reading—A1: 1, A2: 1, B1: 1+, B2: 2+, C1: 3
- Listening—A1: 0+/1, A2: 1, B1: 1+, B2: 2, C1: 2+ (at least)

==== Canada ====
As Canada increasingly uses the CEFR, Larry Vandergrift of the University of Ottawa has proposed Canadian adoption of the CEFR in his report Proposal for a Common Framework of Reference for Languages for Canada published by Canadian Heritage. This report contains a comparison of the CEFR to other standards in use in Canada and proposes an equivalence table.

CEFR	ILR	ACTFL	NB OPS	CLB	PSC PSC
A1	0/0+/1	Novice (Low/Mid/High)	Unrated/0+/1	1/2	A
A2	1+	Intermediate (Low/Mid/High)	1+/2	3/4	B
B1	2	Advanced Low	2+	5/6	C
B2	2+	Advanced Mid	3	7/8	
C1	3/3+	Advanced High	3+	9/10	
C2	4	Superior	4	11/12	
C2+	4+/5				

The resulting correspondence between the ILR and ACTFL scales disagrees with the generally accepted one. The ACTFL standards were developed so that Novice, Intermediate, Advanced and Superior would correspond to 0/0+, 1/1+, 2/2+ and 3/3+, respectively on the ILR scale. Also, the ILR and NB OPS scales do not correspond despite the fact that the latter was modelled on the former.

A 2007 document by Macdonald and Vandergrift estimates the following correspondences (for oral ability) between the Public Service Commission levels and the CEFR levels:

PSC	CEFR
A	A2
B	B1/B2
C	B2/C1

Language schools may also propose their own equivalence tables. For example, the Vancouver English Centre provides a comprehensive equivalence table between the various forms of the TOEFL test, the Cambridge exam, the VEC level system, and the CEFR.

=== Language-specific scales ===
Language	Certificate	A1	A2	B1	B2	C1	C2
Multiple	European Consortium for the Certificate of Attainment in Modern Languages. ECL exams can be taken in English, French, German, Hungarian, Italian, Polish, Romanian, Bulgarian, Serbian, Slovak, Russian, Spanish, Croatian, Czech, and Hebrew.	–	A2	B1	B2	C1	–
Multiple	UNIcert			UNIcert I	UNIcert II	UNIcert III	UNIcert IV
Multiple	TELC	A1	A2	B1	B2	C1	C2
Multiple	ALTE level	Breakthrough level	Level 1	Level 2	Level 3	Level 4	Level 5
Multiple	British General Qualifications	GCSE Foundation Tier	GCSE Higher Tier	GCSE Grade 7-9, Grade A, A* -start of A-Level, -AS-Level at grade C	Good Grades in A-Level -AS-Level grade A, -A2-Level Grade C	A2-Level Grade A, -university BA undergraduate in Foreign languages	postgraduate MA/PhD
Basque	IVAP-HAEE			HE 1 – IVAP-HAEE	HE 2 – IVAP-HAEE	HE 3 – IVAP-HAEE	HE 4 – IVAP-HAEE
Basque	HABE			Lehenengo maila – HABE	Bigarren maila – HABE	Hirugarren maila – HABE	Laugarren maila – HABE
Basque	EGA					Euskararen Gaitasun Agiria	
Catalan	Catalan Language Certificates		Bàsic-A2	Elemental-B1	Intermedi-B2	Suficiència-C1	Superior-C2
Catalan	Simtest	A1	A2	B1	B2	C1	C2
Mandarin Chinese	Chinese Hanyu Shuiping Kaoshi (HSK) (Levels according to French and German associations)	HSK Level 1	HSK Level 2	HSK Level 3	HSK Level 4	HSK Level 5	HSK Level 6
Mandarin Chinese	Test of Chinese as a Foreign Language (TOCFL) (Taiwan)	TOCFL Level 1	TOCFL Level 2	TOCFL Level 3	TOCFL Level 4	TOCFL Level 5	TOCFL Level 6
Czech	Czech Language Certificate Exam (CCE)	CCE-A1	CCE-A2	CCE-B1	CCE-B2	CCE-C1	–
Danish	Prøve i Dansk (Danish Language Exam)	Danskprøve A1	Prøve i Dansk 1	Prøve i Dansk 2	Prøve i Dansk 3	Studieprøven	
Dutch	CNaVT – Certificaat Nederlands als Vreemde Taal (Certificate of Dutch as Foreign Language)		Profile tourist and informal language proficiency (PTIT)	Profile societal language proficiency (PMT)	Profile professional language proficiency (PPT), Profile language proficiency higher education (PTHO)	Profile academic language proficiency (PAT)	
Dutch	Inburgeringsexamen (Integration examination for immigrants from outside the EU)	Pre-examination at the embassy of the home country	Examination in the Netherlands				
Dutch	Staatsexamen Nederlands als tweede taal NT2 (State Examination Dutch as second language NT2)			NT2 programma I	NT2 programma II		
English	Anglia Examinations	Preliminary	Elementary	Intermediate	Advanced	Proficiency	Masters
English	Occupational English Test				200–340 (C, C+)	350–440 (B)	450–500 (A)
English	TrackTest	A1 (Beginner)	A2 (Elementary)	B1 (Pre-Intermediate)	B2 (Intermediate)	C1 (Upper-Intermediate)	C2 (Advanced)
English	TOELS: Wheebox Test of English Language Skills	11 (Beginner)	20 (Pre-Intermediate)	25 (Intermediate)	30 (Graduate)	33 (Advanced)	
English	International Test of English Proficiency	0–1.9	2–2.4	2.5–3.4	3.5–4.4	4.5–5.4	5.5–6
English	Oxford Test of English		A2 (51–80)	B1 (81–110)	B2 (111–140)		
English	ESB (English Speaking Board)						
English	IELTS	1.0–2.5	3.0–3.5	4.0–5.0	5.5–6.5	7.0–8.0	8.5–9.0
English	TOEIC Listening & Reading Test	60–105 (listening); 60–110 (reading)	110–270 (listening); 115–270 (reading)	275–395 (listening); 275–380 (reading)	400–485 (listening); 385–450 (reading)	490–495 (listening); 455–495 (reading)	
English	TOEIC Speaking & Writing Test	50–80 (speaking); 30–60 (writing)	90–110 (speaking); 70–110 (writing)	120–150 (speaking); 120–140 (writing)	160–170 (speaking); 150–170 (writing)	180–200 (speaking); 180–200 (writing)	
English	British General Qualifications						
English	CLB (Canadian Language Benchmarks)		3/4	5	6/7	8/9	10–12
English	Versant	26–35	36–46	47–57	58–68	69–78	79–80
English	Speexx Language Assessment Center	10–19	20–29	30–49	50–79	80–89	90–100
English	Duolingo English Test	10–20	25–55	60–85	90–115	120–140	145–160
English	Password English Tests	2.0 – 2.5	3.0 – 3.5	4.0 – 5.0	5.5 – 6.5	7.0 or above	
English	TOEFL (IBT)		10–15 (speaking); 7–12 (writing)	42–71 (total); 4–17 (reading); 9–16 (listening); 16–19 (speaking); 13–16 (writing)	72–94 (total); 18–23 (reading); 17–21 (listening); 20–24 (speaking); 17–23 (writing)	95–113 (total); 24–28 (reading); 22–27 (listening); 25–27 (speaking); 24–28 (writing)	114–120 (total); 29–30 (reading); 28–30 (listening); 28–30 (speaking); 29–30 (writing)
English	TOEFL (ITP)		337	460	543	627	
English	TOEFL Junior Standard		225–245 (listening); 210–245 (language form); 210–240 (reading)	250–285 (listening); 250–275 (language form); 245–275 (reading)	290–300 (listening); 280–300 (language form); 280–300 (reading)		
English	EF Standard English Test	1–30	31–40	41–50	51–60	61–70	71–100
English	City and Guilds English examinations	Preliminary	Access	Achiever	Communicator	Expert	Mastery
English	Regulated Qualifications Framework (UK Only)	Entry Level	Level 1	Level 2	Level 3	Levels 4–6	Level 7–8
English	Cambridge Assessment English	A1 Movers	A2 Key	B1 Preliminary	B2 First	C1 Advanced	C2 Proficiency
English	Michigan Language Assessment	MET Go! Basic User (CEFR A1)	Michigan English Test (MET) (0 to 39) / MET Go! Elementary User (CEFR A2)	Michigan English Test (MET) (40 to 52) / MET Go! Intermediate User (CEFR B1)	ECCE / Michigan English Test (MET) (53 to 63)	Michigan English Test (MET) (64 to 80)	ECPE
English	WIDA ACCESS – Listening and Reading, Speaking, Writing	A1 Preliminary (Entry Level 1)	A2 Access (Entry Level 2)	B1 Achiever (Entry Level 3)	B2 Communicator (Level 1)	C1 Expert (Level 2)	C2 Mastery (Level 3)
English	LanguageCert International ESOL – Listening, Reading, Writing 6 levels spanning A1 to B2?	? 1.0-	?	? 4.5-5.7	? 5.8-6.0		
English	LanguageCert Academic – Listening, Reading, Writing, Speaking			B1 Achiever (40–59) (Entry Level 3)	B2 Communicator (60–74 ) (Level 1)	C1 Expert (75–89) (Level 2)	C2 Mastery (90+) (Level 3)
English	LanguageCert General – Listening, Reading, Writing, Speaking		A2 Access (20–39) (Entry Level 2)	B1 Achiever (40–59) (Entry Level 3)	B2 Communicator (60–74 ) (Level 1)	C1 Expert (75–89) (Level 2)	
English	PTE Academic	10–29	30–42	43–58	59–75	76–84	85–90
English	PTE General (formerly LTE)	Level A1	Level 1	Level 2	Level 3	Level 4	Level 5
English	Trinity College London Integrated Skills in English (ISE) / Graded Examinations in Spoken English (GESE)	GESE 2	ISE 0 GESE 3, 4	ISE I GESE 5, 6	ISE II; GESE 7, 8, 9	ISE III; GESE 10, 11	ISE IV; GESE 12
English	Learning Resource Network	CEF A1	CEF A2	CEF B1	CEF B2	CEF C1	CEF C2
English	Eiken (Japanese test of English)	5,4,3	Pre-2	2	Pre-1	1	
Esperanto	Komuna Eŭropa Referenckadro por Lingvoj	A1	A2	B1	B2	C1	C2
Finnish	YKI	1	2	3	4	5	6
French	CIEP / Alliance française diplomas	TCF A1 / DELF A1	TCF A2 / DELF A2 / CEFP 1	TCF B1 / DELF B1 / CEFP 2	TCF B2 / DELF B2 / Diplôme de Langue	TCF C1 / DALF C1 / DSLCF	TCF C2 / DALF C2 / DHEF
French	CLB/NCLC Canadian Language Benchmarks		3/4	5	6/7	8/9	10–12
French	Speexx Language Assessment Center	10–19	20–29	30–49	50–79	80–89	90–100
Galician	Certificado de lingua galega (CELGA)		CELGA 1	CELGA 2	CELGA 3	CELGA 4	CELGA 5
German	Goethe-Institut	Goethe-Zertifikat A1 Start Deutsch 1	Goethe-Zertifikat A2 Start Deutsch 2	Goethe-Zertifikat B1 Zertifikat Deutsch (ZD)	Goethe-Zertifikat B2 Zertifikat Deutsch für den Beruf (ZDfB)	Goethe-Zertifikat C1 Zentrale Mittelstufenprüfung	Goethe-Zertifikat C2 – Großes Deutsches Sprachdiplom (GDS) Zentrale Oberstufenprüfung / Kleines Deutsches Sprachdiplom
German	Speexx Language Assessment Center	10–19	20–29	30–49	50–79	80–89	90–100
German	Österreichisches Sprachdiplom Deutsch	A1 ÖSD Zertifikat A1 (ÖSD ZA1)	A2 ÖSD Zertifikat A2 (ÖSD ZA2)	B1 ÖSD Zertifikat Deutsch Österreich (ÖSD B1 ZDÖ); B1 ÖSD Zertifikat B1 (ZB1)	B2 ÖSD Zertifikat B2 (ÖSD ZB2)	C1 ÖSD Zertifikat C1 (ÖSD ZC1)	C2 ÖSD Zertifikat C2 (ÖSD ZC2); C2 ÖSD Zertifikat C2 / Wirtschaftssprache Deutsch (ÖSD ZC2 / WD)
German	Deutsch als Fremdsprache in der Wirtschaft (WiDaF)	–	0–246	247–495	496–735	736–897	898–990
German	TestDaF				TDN 3—TDN 4	TDN 4—TDN 5	
Greek	Πιστοποίηση Ελληνομάθειας (Certificate of Attainment in Modern Greek)	Α1 (Στοιχειώδης Γνώση)	Α2 (Βασική Γνώση)	Β1 (Μέτρια Γνώση)	Β2 (Καλή Γνώση)	Γ1 (Πολύ Καλή Γνώση)	Γ2 (Άριστη Γνώση)
Hebrew	Ulpan (as codified by the Rothberg International School)	A1.1 Aleph Beginner A1.2 Aleph Advanced	A2 Bet	B1 Gimel	B2 Dalet	C1.1 Hé C1.2 Vav	C2 Native Speaker
Icelandic	Íslenskupróf vegna umsóknar um íslenskan ríkisborgararétt	Pass					
Irish	Teastas Eorpach na Gaeilge (TEG)	A1 Bonnleibhéal 1	A2 Bonnleibhéal 2	B1 Meánleibhéal 1	B2 Meánleibhéal 2	C1 Ardleibhéal 1	
Italian	CELI	Impatto	1	2	3	4	5
Italian	Roma Tre cert.it	A1-cert.it	A2-cert.it	B1-cert.it	B2-cert.it	C1-cert.it	C2-cert.it
Italian	CILS	A1	A2	Uno	Due	Tre	Quattro / DIT C2
Italian	PLIDA (Dante Alighieri Society diplomas)	PLIDA A1	PLIDA A2	PLIDA B1	PLIDA B2	PLIDA C1	PLIDA C2
Japanese	Japanese-Language Proficiency Test (JLPT)	N5 Total Score (80–180)	N3 Total Score (95–103) N4 Total Score (90–180)	N2 Total Score (90–111) N3 Total Score (104–180)	N1 Total Score (100–141) N2 Total Score (112-180)	N1 Total Score (142–180)	N/A
Japanese	J-Test	F	E	D	C	Pre-B; B Pre-A	A Special A
Japanese	Japan Foundation Test for Basic Japanese (JFT-Basic)		Pass				
Japanese	Certificate of Japanese as a Foreign Language (J-Cert)	N/A	A2.1 A2.2	B1	B2	C1	C2
Luxembourgish	Institut National des Langues		A2	B1	B2	C1	
Norwegian	Norskprøve	A1	A2	B1	B2	C1 – høyere akademisk nivå (advanced academic level)	
Polish	Egzaminy Certyfikatowe z Języka Polskiego jako Obcego			B1 (podstawowy)	B2 (średni ogólny)	C1 (efektywna biegłość użytkowa)	C2 (zaawansowany)
Portuguese	CAPLE	ACESSO	CIPLE	DEPLE	DIPLE	DAPLE	DUPLE
Portuguese	CELPE-Bras	Intermediate	Intermediate	Superior Intermediate	Superior Intermediate	Advanced	Superior Advanced
Russian	ТРКИ – Тест по русскому языку как иностранному (TORFL – Test of Russian as a Foreign Language)	ТЭУ Элементарный уровень (Elementary level)	ТБУ Базовый уровень (Basic level)	ТРКИ-1 (I Сертификационный уровень) (1st Certificate level)	ТРКИ-2	ТРКИ-3	ТРКИ-4
Romanian	Attestation exam at the Institute of the Romanian Language	Nivel A1	Nivel A2	Nivel B1	Nivel B2	Nivel C1	Nivel C2 [→]
Spanish	DELE	A1	A2	B1 (formerly "Inicial")	B2 (formerly "Intermedio")	C1	C2 (formerly "Superior")
Spanish	Speexx Language Assessment Center	10–19	20–29	30–49	50–79	80–89	90–100
Spanish	LanguageCert USAL esPro BULATS	10–19	20–39	40–59	60–74	75–89	90–100
Swedish	TISUS	–	–	–	–	Pass	–
Swedish	Swedex	–	A2	B1	B2	–	–
Swedish	YKI	1	2	3	4	5	6
Taiwanese	GTPT – General Taiwanese Proficiency Test	151–220	221–290	291–340	341–380	381–430	431–500
Taiwanese	Bân-lâm-gú Gú-giân Lîng-li̍k Jīn-tsìng	A1	A2	B1	B2	C1	C2
Turkish	TYS				B2 (55–70%)	C1 (71–88%)	C2 (89–100%)
Ukrainian	UMI/ULF – Ukrainian as foreign language	UMI 1	UMI 2	UMI 3	UMI 4	UMI 5	UMI 6
Welsh	WJEC Defnyddio'r Gymraeg	Mynediad (Entry)	Sylfaen (Foundation)	Canolradd (Intermediate)	Uwch (Advanced)	–	–

== Difficulty in aligning the CEFR with teaching programmes ==
Language schools and certificate bodies evaluate their equivalences against the framework. Differences in estimation have been found to exist, for example, with the same level on the PTE A, TOEFL, and IELTS, and is a cause of debate between test producers.

== Non-Western areas and languages ==
The CEFR, initially developed to ease human mobility and economic growth within the highly multilingual European Union, has since influenced and been borrowed by various other areas.

=== Non-Western learners ===
In Japan, the adoption of CEFR has been encouraged by academics, institutional actors (MEXT), politicians, business associations, and by learners themselves. Adoption in Malaysia has also been documented. In Vietnam, adoption of the CEFR has been connected to recent changes in English language policy, efforts to reform higher education, orientation toward economic opportunities and a tendency for administrators to look outwards for domestic solutions.

Noriyuki (2009) observes the "mechanical" reuse of the European framework and concepts by Japanese teachers of mostly Western languages, missing the recontextualisation part: the need to adapt the conceptual vocabulary to the local language and to adapt the framework to the local public, its language and practices.

Around 2005, the Osaka University of Foreign Studies developed a CEFR-inspired project for its 25 foreign languages, with a transparent and common evaluation approach. While major languages had long had well-defined tools for the Japanese public, able to guide teachers in teaching and performing assessments in a methodic way, this project pushed the adoption of similar practices to smaller languages, as requested by students.

In late 2006–2010, the Keio University led the ambitious CEFR-inspired Action Oriented Plurilingual Language Learning Project to favour multi-campus and inter-language cooperation in creating teaching materials and assessment systems from child to university levels. Since 2015, the "Research on Plurilinguistic and Pluricultural Skill Development in Integrated Foreign Language Education" has followed up.

=== Non-European languages ===
The framework was translated into Chinese in 2008. In 2011, French sinologist Joël Bellassen suggests the CEFR together with its metalanguage could and should be adapted to distant languages such as Chinese, with the necessity to adapt and extend it with relevant concepts proper to the new language and its learners. Various efforts on adaptation to Chinese have been made. In 2018, Italian linguist Annamaria Ventura proposed an A0 level for Arabic language taking into consideration diglossia in Arabic, introducing the concept of diglossic switching.

== Companion Volume ==
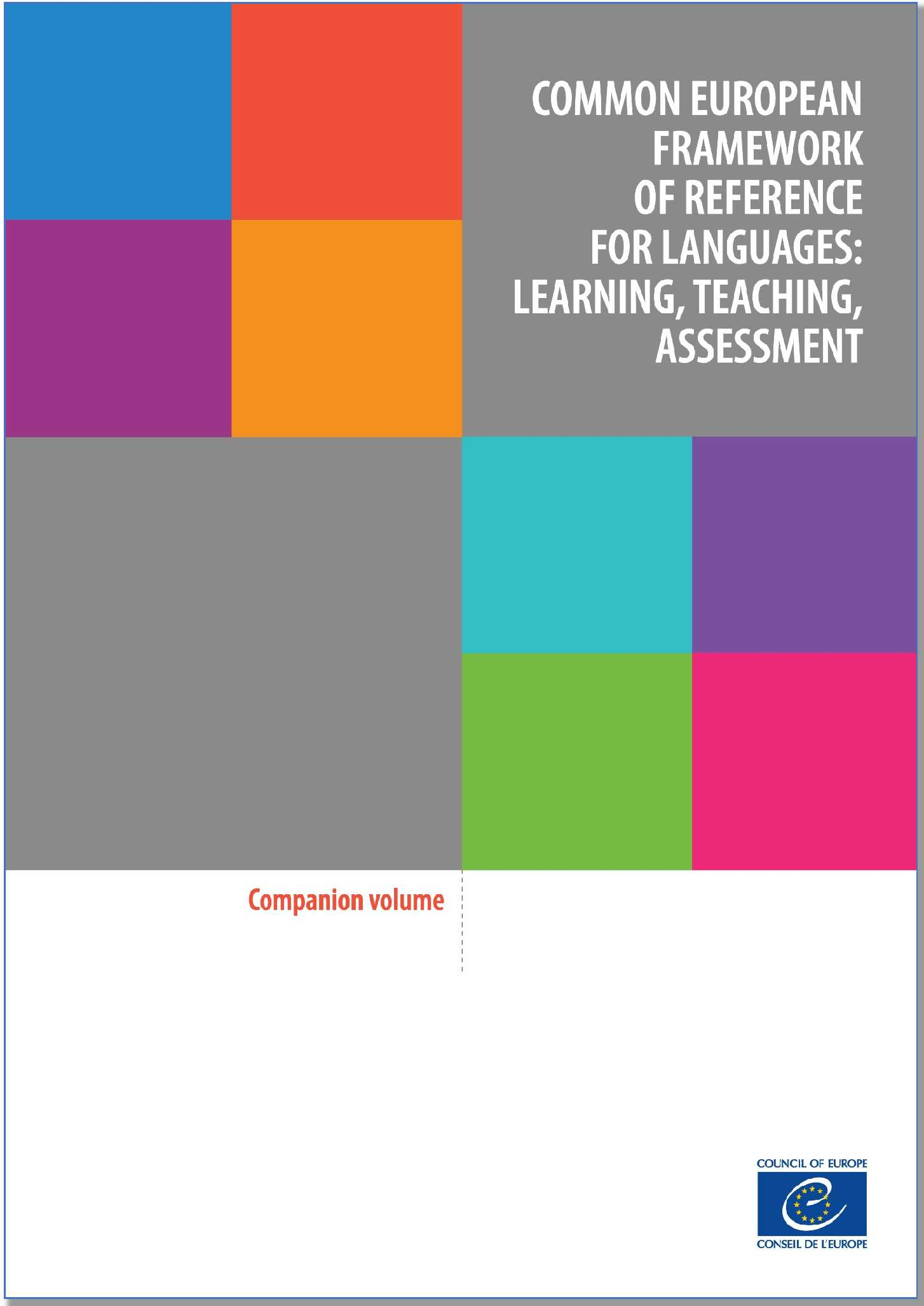
CEFR-Companion Volume (2020)

The CEFR Companion Volume (CEFR-CV) is an extension and update of the original CEFR. It provides new and extended illustrative descriptors covering a wider range of communicative activities, including online interaction, mediation, plurilingual/pluricultural competence, and sign language competencies. It also introduces various communicative language activities and strategies. Additionally, existing descriptors have been refined to more accurately reflect the nuances of language use and to address any identified gaps since the original CEFR publication. The Companion Volume also emphasizes inclusivity, and includes descriptors for online interaction. The Council of Europe gave the new version of the CEFR (published in 2020) the title "Companion Volume", as it quotes central passages from the original CEFR and explains them. At the same time, it redefines the underlying construct (i.e. "language as social action").

=== "Mediation" ===
In the 2001 edition, "mediation" meant translating, interpreting, summarizing, reporting, etc. As such, it had become part of the foreign language curricula of secondary schools in Germany, Austria and other European states. In the CEFR-CV, however, mediation now refers to processes employed by multiple language users when jointly constructing meaning.

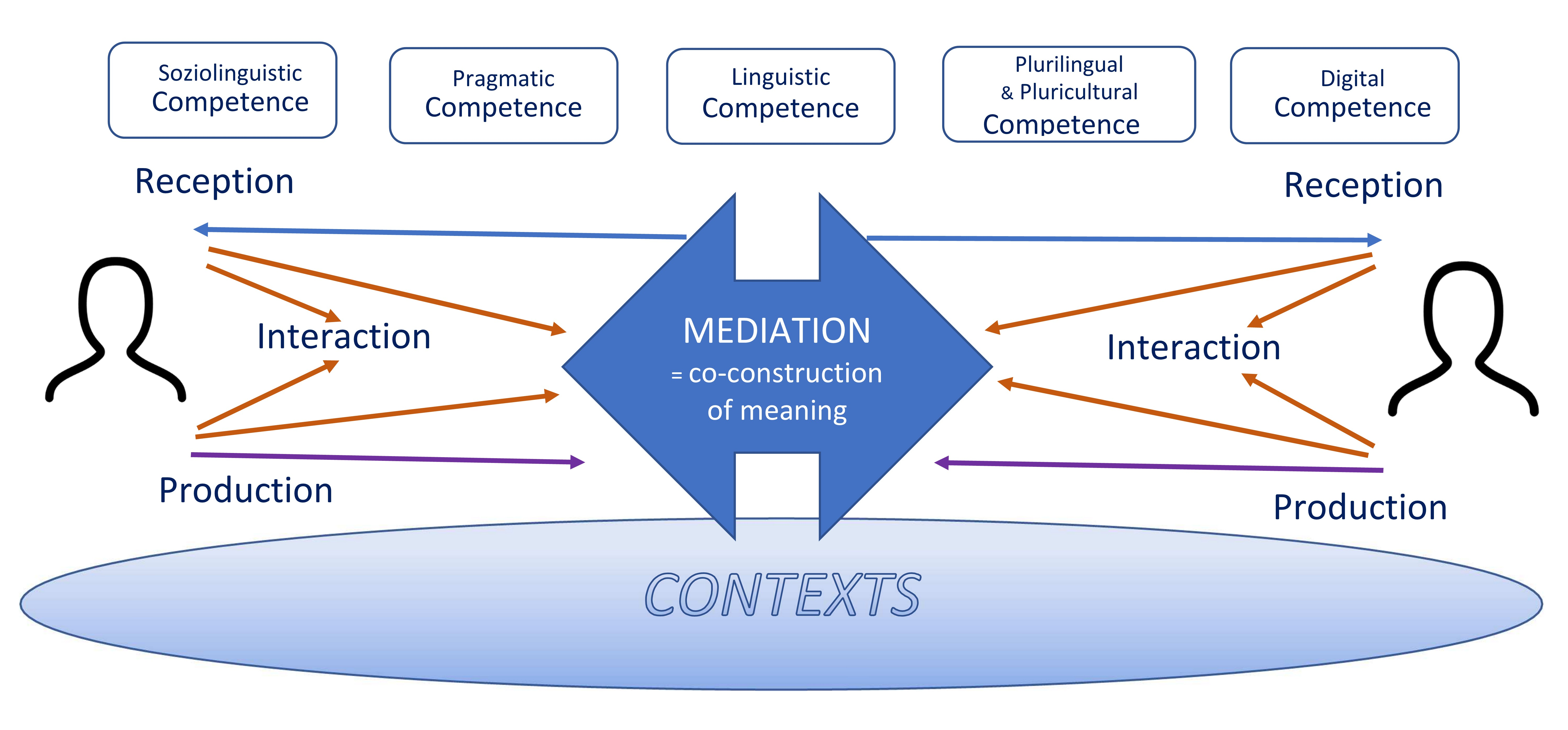
"Mediation" according to the CEFR-CV

A distinction is made between "Cognitive Mediation" and "Relational Mediation". The scales on Cognitive Mediation describe the process of facilitating access to knowledge and concepts. In contrast, the scales under Relational Mediation focus on the processes of establishing and maintaining interpersonal relationships to create a cooperative environment. (Note: The CEFR-CV contains an illustration on mediation which does not take the social constructivist approach into account. (Council of Europe 2020: 35).)

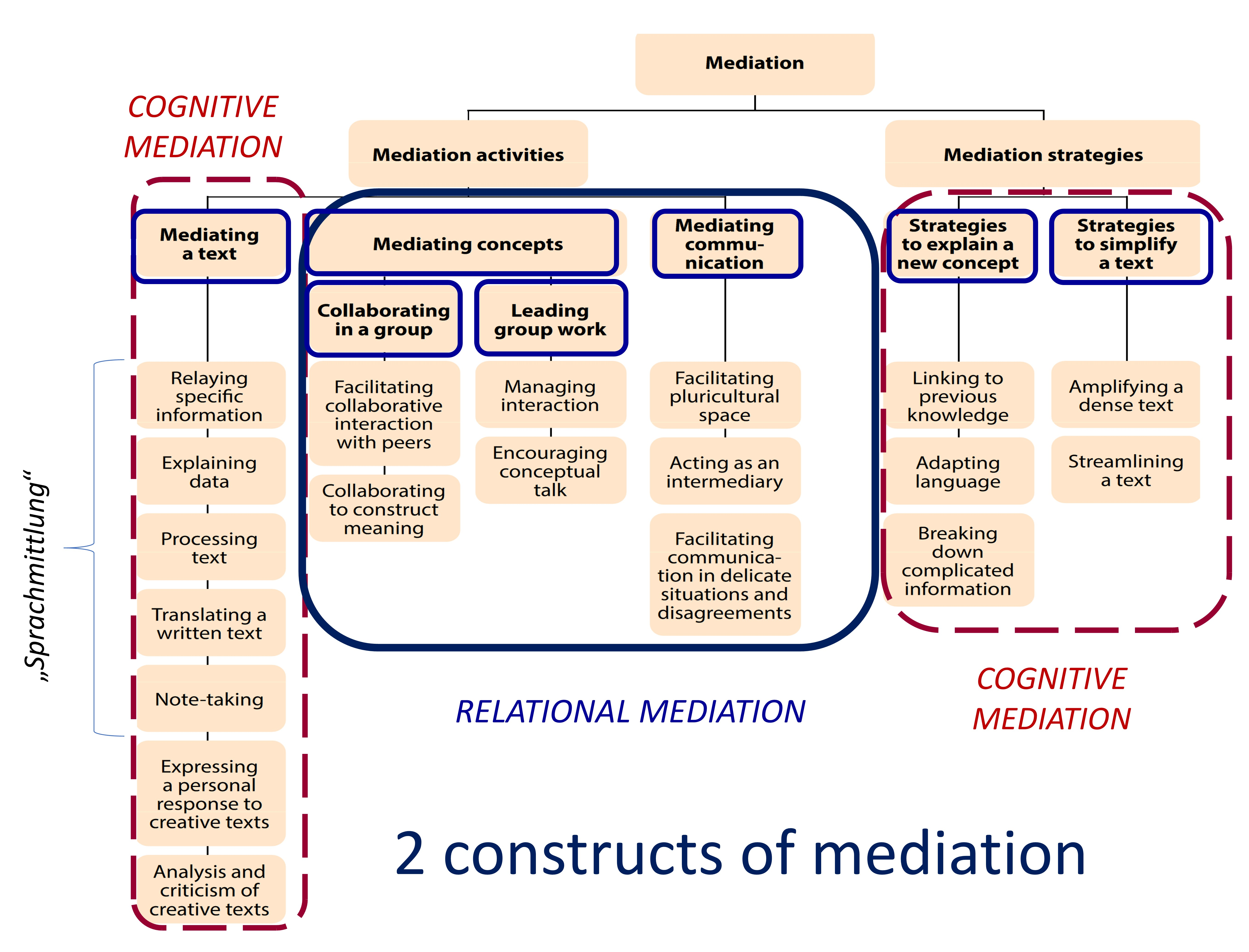
Overview of "Mediation", CEFR-CV

=== No native speaker standards ===
Unlike in 2001, all references to a native speaker standard have disappeared in the CEFR-CV. In the 2001 edition, the use of 'native speaker' sometimes led to misunderstandings. In the CEFR-CV, pronunciation at C2, for example, is described as follows:

Can employ the full range of phonological features in the target language with a high level of control – including prosodic features such as word and sentence stress, rhythm and intonation – so that the finer points of their message are clear and precise. Intelligibility and effective conveyance and enhancement of meaning are not affected in any way by features of accent that may be retained from other language(s).

=== Descriptor scales ===
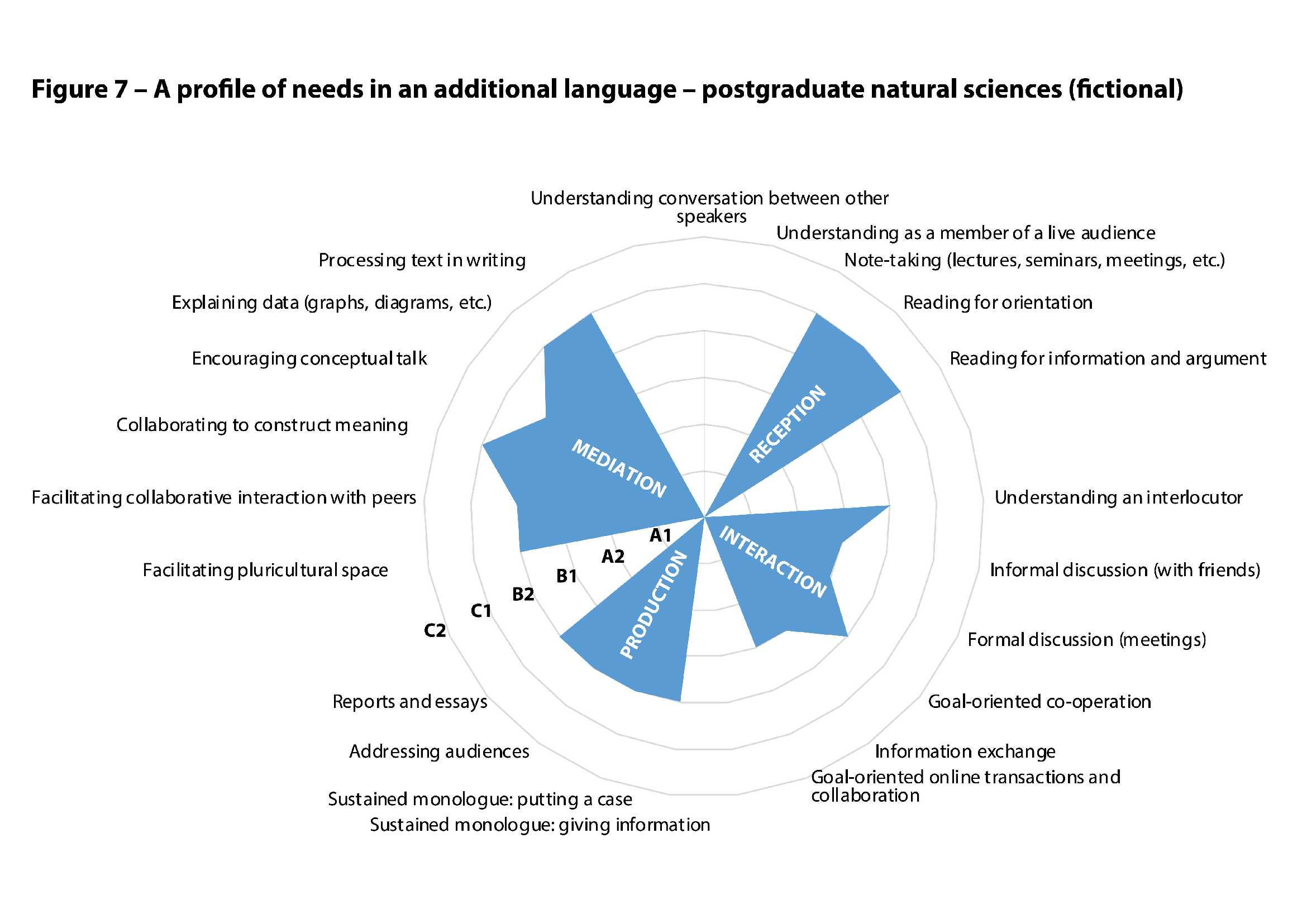
Fictional competence profile. Council of Europe 2020: 47.

The CEFR's 54 descriptor scales had been reduced to a single scale, i.e. the "Global Scale". This misunderstanding is documented by the use of a six-step staircase to illustrate the competence model suggested by the CEFR. In the CEFR-CV, the descriptor scales are intended to describe context-specific, differentiated competence profiles.

The illustrative descriptors are one source for the development of standards appropriate to the context concerned; they are not in themselves offered as standards. They are a basis for reflection, discussion and further action. The aim is to open new possibilities, not to pre-empt decisions. The CEFR itself makes this point very clearly, stating that the descriptors are presented as recommendations and are not in any way mandatory.

— Council of Europe

== See also ==
- Assessment of basic language and learning skills
- European Day of Languages (26 September)
- ILR scale (Interagency Language Roundtable scale)
- List of language proficiency tests
- Studies in Language Testing (SiLT)
- Task-based language teaching

== Literature ==
- Alderson, J. C., Figueras, N., Kuijper, H., Nold, G. Takala, S., Tardieu, C. (2004): The development of specifications for item development and classification within The Common European Framework of Reference for Languages: Learning, Teaching, Assessment: Reading and Listening: Final report of The Dutch CEF Construct Project. Lancaster University (unpublished).
- Council of Europe (ed.) (2001): A Common European Framework of Reference for Languages: Learning, Teaching, Assessment. Strasbourg. Deutsch: Goethe-Institut, et al. (Hg.) (2001): Gemeinsamer europäischer Referenzrahmen für Sprachen: Lernen, lehren, beurteilen. Munich, Berlin. J. Trim, B. North, D. Coste, J. Sheils. Translated by J. Quetz, et al.
- Debray, C.; Spencer-Oatey; H. (2022): Co-constructing good relations through troubles talk in diverse teams. Journal of Pragmatics (2022), 85–97.
- Vogt, K. and Quetz, J. (2021): Der neue Begleitband zum Gemeinsamen europäischen Referenzrahmen für Sprachen. Berlin, Germany.
