= YKI test =

Language certification

YKI (Finnish: Yleinen Kielitutkinto, Swedish: Allmän språkexamen, English: National Certificate of Language Proficiency) is an official certification in languages such as Finnish, Swedish and Northern Sámi issued by the University of Jyväskylä and sanctioned by the Finnish Ministry of Education, following a standardized exam comprising oral and written parts that match the Common European Framework of Reference for Languages (CEFR) requirements and proficiency levels.

== Scoring ==
The YKI certification divides linguistic proficiency into three broad levels: advanced, intermediate, and basic. These can be further divided into six levels that match the CEFR classification system.

CEFR	YKI
A1	1
A2	2
B1	3
B2	4
C1	5
C2	6

== Languages ==
The YKI test is offered in English, Finnish, French, German, Italian, Northern Sámi, Russian, Spanish and Swedish. Foreigners must pass the intermediate level certification in Finnish or Swedish (levels 3 or 4) in order to qualify for Finnish citizenship. YKI certificates in other languages can be used to prove official competency in a language when applying for a job or study position.
