= DELE =

Spanish language diploma

The Diplomas de Español como Lengua Extranjera (English: Diplomas of Spanish as a Foreign Language), or DELE, are official diplomas issued by the Spanish Instituto Cervantes on behalf of the Spanish Ministry of Education and Science to participants who have passed a standardised test indicating their Spanish language proficiency. The diplomas do not expire. Every year, more than 60,000 examinations are taken by candidates in more than 800 examination centres from more than 100 countries. In many countries, the DELE Diplomas have been adopted by schools and universities as a complement to their own evaluation systems, such that it is used as an entry requirement for non-native Spanish speakers.

A related diploma offered by the Instituto Cervantes since 2015 is the Servicio Internacional de Evaluación de la Lengua Española (SIELE; English: International Spanish Language Evaluation Service) that tests knowledge of a few Latin American varieties of Spanish as well as European Spanish.

== History ==
DELE were created by the Spanish Ministry of Education in 1989. The University of Salamanca, having issued its own certifications in Spanish until 1991, agreed with the Ministry of Education of Spain to undertake the development, production and grading of the examinations leading eventually to the DELE Diplomas.

Since 2002, the Instituto Cervantes has been responsible for the examination; it also acts as a Central Examinations Board and issues the Diplomas. The Instituto Cervantes has been delegating the tasks of setting up the examinations, designing test papers and grading to the University of Salamanca since then.

== Test ==
Originally, the DELE existed in only three levels, but later on developed into six levels, each corresponding to a certain level described by the Common European Framework of Reference for Languages. The content and duration of the tests vary.

| Tests | Description | Content and duration of test | Passing conditions | Denomination |
|---|---|---|---|---|
| Diploma de Español (nivel A1) | The test accredits that students' ability to use basic language in communication situations involving immediate needs or very common everyday matters. | The test consists of two parts. In the first part, in which reading and writing skills are tested, candidates are required to complete a reading comprehension test (45 minutes) and tasks of written expression and interaction (25 minutes). In the second part, in which speaking skills are tested, candidates are required to do a listening comprehension test (20 minutes) and tasks of oral expression and interaction (15 minutes). | The maximum possible score for the examination is 100 points. Candidates need to get 30 in each part of the exam in order to receive an overall "passing" grade. | Initial |
| Diploma de Español (nivel A2) | The test accredits that students can understand commonly used everyday phrases and expressions related to areas of experience particularly relevant to them (e.g. basic information about themselves and their families, shopping, places of interest, occupations, etc.). | The test consists of two parts. In the first part, in which reading and writing skills are tested, candidates are required to complete a reading comprehension test (60 minutes) and tasks of written expression and interaction (50 minutes). In the second part, in which speaking skills are tested, candidates are required to do a listening comprehension (35 minutes) and tasks of oral expression and interaction (15 minutes). | The maximum possible score for the examination is 100 points. Candidates need to get 30 in each part of the exam in order to receive an overall "passing" grade. | Low Intermediate |
| Diploma de Español (nivel B1) | The test accredits language users’ capacity to: Understand the main ideas of clear texts, in standard language, if they involve well-known topics related to work, studies or leisure.; Handle most situations on a trip; Produce simple texts about common topics or subject matters of interest.; Describe: experiences, events, wishes and hopes as well as briefly justify opinions or explain plans. | The tests is divided into two groups and there are two parts in each group. In the first group, candidates are required to complete a reading comprehension test (70 min) and a listening comprehension test (40 min). In the second group, candidates have to finish a written expression and interaction test (60 min) and a spoken expression and interaction test (15 min + 15 min to prepare). | To pass the test one must get a minimum of 60 points out of 100 in the examination, provided that one gets at least 30 points out of 50 in each group of tests. | Intermediate |
| Diploma de Español (nivel B2) | The test accredits language users’ capacity to: Understand the gist of complex texts, regardless of whether they are about concrete or abstract themes. Even technical texts should be understood as long as they are within the candidates’ field of specialisation.; Interact with native speakers with sufficient fluency and spontaneity, so that communication does not constitute an effort for the interlocutors.; Produce clear and detailed texts about diverse topics, as well as defend a point of view on general topics, stating the pros and cons of the different options. | The tests is divided into two groups and there are two parts in each group. In the first group, candidates are required to complete a reading comprehension test (70 min) and a listening comprehension test (40 min). In the second group, candidates are required to finish a written expression and interaction test (80 min) and a spoken expression and interaction test (15 min + 15 min to prepare). | To pass the test one must get a minimum of 60 points out of 100 in the examination, provided that one gets at least 30 points out of 50 in each group of tests. | Advanced |
| Diploma de Español (nivel C1) | The test certifies that the candidates have sufficient linguistic competence to: Understand a wide variety of long, quite demanding texts as well as recognise implicit meanings in them.; Express themselves fluently and spontaneously, without any obvious effort to find the right words.; Use the language flexibly and effectively for social, academic and professional purposes.; Be able to produce clear, well-structured, detailed texts on topics having a certain level of complexity, with correct use of mechanisms for organising and articulating a cohesive text. | The test consists of four tests, classified in two groups (Group 1: Test 1 and test 3. Group: 2: Test 2 and test 4): Test 1: Reading comprehension and use of language (90 minutes).; Test 2: Listening comprehension and use of language (50 minutes).; Test 3: Integrated skills. Listening comprehension and written expression and interaction (80 minutes).; Test 4: Integrated skills. Reading comprehension and oral expression and interaction (20 minutes) (and 20 minutes for preparation). | The maximum possible score on the examination is 100 points. A minimum score of 30 is necessary for each of the two groups in order to receive an overall "passing" grade. | High Advanced |
| Diploma de Español (nivel C2) | The test certifies that the candidates have sufficient linguistic competence to perfectly handle any kind of situation, proving a spontaneous capacity of adaptation to any context, with a great deal of semantic and grammatical precision. The language users express themselves fluently, with a high degree of specialisation and complexity. | The exam consists of three tests: Test 1: Use of language, reading and listening comprehension (105 minutes).; Test 2: Integrated skills: Listening and reading comprehension, and written expression and interaction (150 minutes).; Test 3: Integrated skills: Reading comprehension and oral expression and interaction (20 minutes) (and 30 minutes for preparation). | A “passing” grade is required for each of the tests that a candidate sits during the same examination session. The maximum possible score in the examination is 100 points. A minimum score of 20 is necessary for each of the three tests. | Superior |

== Examination centres ==
The DELE examinations are carried out in a network of Cervantes Centres and in a wide network of DELE examination centres. There are currently more than 800 centres in over 100 countries. For example: universities, teaching centres of Spanish, academies, embassies and consulates could also serve as examination centres.

Any language institution in the world, having satisfied the requirements set by Instituto Cervantes, can apply to become an examination centre. One of the advantages of being an examination centre, as claimed by the Instituto Cervantes, is that it could diversify the courses available by offering courses to prepare for these examinations and its status as an examination centre could draw a greater number of students.

The examination centres should be responsible for all the organisational preparations of DELE exams, though a centre need not provide the DELE exam at all levels. Examination centres also give academic advice to candidates concerning the level of examinations a candidate should take and how they should prepare for the exam. When possible, they may offer courses to prepare for the examinations at each level. The examination centres are also responsible for helping to promote the DELE examination.

The examination centres must undertake to treat the documentation and the instructions received from the Instituto Cervantes in a confidential way and not to make undue use thereof.

== Examiners ==
The following people may become DELE examiners:

- Teachers employed by Instituto Cervantes.
- Teachers employed by the Education Offices of Spain.
- Language assistants employed by the Spanish Agency for International Cooperation.
- Other teachers who speak Spanish natively.
- Teachers whose mother tongue is not Spanish but who hold a university degree in Spanish or a DELE C2 certificate.

Examiners are trained through specific courses, which are offered in three formats namely online, face-to-face and blended, in order to be familiar with DELE exams and all their duties. All examiners must avoid possible conflicts of interest with candidates. When the candidates are their students, family members or friends, they must communicate with their corresponding superiors.

== Fees ==
Registration fees for DELE vary. It depends on the level of the test as well as the country where the examination is taken. To give one example, Charles III University of Madrid charges €130 ($150) for the A2 diploma and €205 ($230) for the C1 diploma in the 2022 academic year.

== Results ==
The Instituto Cervantes publishes the results approximately three months after the examination, upon the approval of grades by the University of Salamanca. Participants need to pass all parts of the exam in order to pass the entire test. The average passing rate including all levels was 61% in 2012; but the passing rate decreased significantly with the increased difficulty from A1, where the passing rate was higher than 75%, to C2 level, where more than half of the participants failed the test. The results are permanently valid. The C2 exam is considered by some to be the most difficult official Spanish language exam available.

== Preparation ==
In order to prepare for the examination, sample examination papers and audio material can be obtained at the official website of DELE.

Teachers preparing students for the examination can also find teachers' guides and other teaching materials and resources on the DELE website.

== Recognition ==
DELE is internationally recognised among public and private educational institutions and authorities as well as in the business world and chambers of commerce. In many countries, DELE has been adopted by educational authorities and schools as a complement to their own systems of assessment, such that it is used as an entry requirement for non-native Spanish speakers. They are useful to facilitate promotion at work and access to education, both in Spain and in the other countries where the tests are taken.

While a DELE B2 certificate is normally enough to fulfil the language requirement for admittance to universities in Spain, the Ministry of Health of Spain has modified the requirements for language proficiency in Spanish for those wishing to apply for specialised medical training places. Candidates who are citizens of countries where Spanish is not the official language must prove that they have sufficient competence in Spanish by passing the DELE exam C1 or C2. The DELE B2 is no longer accepted for these medical training places.

Several American universities award course credit for the diplomas or require Spanish majors to acquire them.

== Enrollment ==
Over 100,000 people have taken the DELE exams in 80 countries and 290 cities throughout the world.

== International affiliation ==
As the organisers of the DELE examination, Instituto Cervantes and the University of Salamanca are jointly a member of the Association of Language Testers in Europe (ALTE), where they communicate with language testers of other European countries on issues concerning language tests.

Instituto Cervantes, as the organiser of the DELE examination, is also a member of Sistema Internacional de Certificación del Español como Lengua Extrajera (SICELE), an association aiming at enhancing the cooperation and coordination in language assessment in Spanish, in order to promote the study of Spanish as a foreign language.

Instituto Cervantes, as a member of ALTE and SICELE, endorses the code of ethics and principles of good practice of these associations, which are made extensive to DELE examiners.
