= Swedex =

Swedish language proficiency test

Swedex: Swedish Examinations is a test for proficiency in the Swedish language, recognized by the Swedish Institute.

It is offered on the levels of the Common European Framework of Reference for Languages A2, B1 and B2.

Tests can be taken in 28 countries (Europe, Asia, North America, South America and Africa).

Swedex is a European Union project within the Socrates programme.

== See also ==
- Test in Swedish for University Studies (TISUS)
