= City and Guilds English examinations =

English language examination

The City and Guilds examination body issues a number of English examinations for speakers of English as a second or other language (ESOL). The exams use a communicative approach, and can be taken at educational institutions approved by City and Guilds. City and Guilds developed its English examinations after they acquired the Pitman Examinations Institute in 1990. Pitman had a range of language qualifications, and City and Guilds took these over and developed them into their current range of English examinations. The exams that they offer include International ESOL, International Spoken ESOL, International Business English, English for Office Skills, and English for Young Learners.

In 2015, PeopleCert (www.peoplecert.org) acquired the City & Guilds English Language exams and all related intellectual property from City & Guilds. The IESOL & ISESOL exam suites were reintroduced to the market in 2016 as LanguageCert International ESOL examinations.
