= Diplôme d'études en langue française =

French language certification

DELF A1 Diploma

The Diplôme d'études en langue française (English: Diploma in French Language Studies), or DELF for short, is a diploma of French language abilities for non-native French speakers. It is administered by France Education International for France's Ministry of Education and composed of four independent diplomas corresponding to the first four levels of the Common European Framework of Reference for Languages: A1, A2, B1 and B2. Levels A1 and A2 are for basic users. Levels B1 and B2 are for advanced users. Diplomas are valid for life and do not expire.

The examinations are available in three varieties: DELF Tout Public which is aimed at adults, DELF Prim which is for Primary School students (only available at A1.1, A1 and A2), DELF Junior / Scolaire which is aimed at Secondary School students. Each variety is worth exactly the same and results in the awarding of the same diploma, but the material is varied to ensure that it is appropriate for the target cohort.

The "proficient" divisions of language proficiency are certified by the Diplôme approfondi de langue française (DALF) levels C1 to C2.

== Exam sections ==
In the DELF examinations, the listening, reading and writing Épreuves Collectives (collective tests) are done back-to-back and the oral examination is taken separately.

=== Part one: listening ===
In this section the candidate is presented with a series of recordings and asked to fill out some comprehension questions regarding the selection played. At levels A1 to B1, each selection is played twice, and ranges from a maximum of 3 minutes in length at the A1 level to a maximum of 6 minutes in length at the B1 level. In the B2 examination, candidates are presented with two recordings. The first recording is played twice and the second only once, with the total length of recordings being approximately 8 minutes.

=== Part two: reading ===
This section tests the candidates' reading comprehension by presenting several short pieces of writing, followed by comprehension questions requiring simple filling (ticking, multiple choice, true/false) or a justified written answer. At A1 and A2 levels, candidates are presented with several short texts or signs. At B1 and B2 levels, candidates are given longer texts, with the total length of B2 texts being around 1000 words.

=== Part three: writing ===
This tests the candidates written skills and again varies in subjects according to the level.

- A1 – The first task is to fill out a document with required personal information. The second task is a simple text with daily life content.
- A2 – The first task is to describe a brief event or an experience. The second task is to write a text of: expression of invitation, congratulations, application, giving information, justification etc.
- B1 – Expression of the personal viewpoint in a given situation through an essay, a letter or an article.
- B2 – Personal viewpoint and argumentation in a justified application, reply to message etc., much like at B1 level.

The required length of writing is 40 words for A1, 60 to 80 words for A2, 160 to 180 words for B1 and at least 250 words for B2.

=== Part four: speaking ===
At the A1 and A2 levels this section consists of a guided conversation where the candidate is prompted by the examiner, a short exchange of information on a defined subject and finally a role-play between the examiner and the candidate. At the B1 level it consists of a guided conversation, an interactive exercise and discussion of a document designed to elicit a reaction from the candidate. At the B2 level, the candidate is expected to state and defend an opinion, based on a short document designed to elicit a reaction.

== Scoring ==
Although the difficulty varies, the scoring of the DELF is identical at each level. Sections are scored out of 25, for a total of 100 marks per test. In order to pass, a minimum of 5/25 must be achieved in each section, and a minimum of 50/100 overall.

== Duration of answering time ==
Exam	Listening	Reading	Writing	Total of Épreuves Collectives (collective tests)	Speaking
DELF A1	20 mins	30 mins	30 mins	80 mins	5–7 mins and 10 mins prep.
DELF A2	25 mins	30 mins	45 mins	100 mins	6–8 mins and 10 mins prep.
DELF B1	25 mins	45 mins	45 mins	115 mins	15 mins and 10 mins prep.
DELF B2	30 mins	60 mins	60 mins	150 mins	20 mins and 30 mins prep.

== See also ==
Test de connaissance du français (TCF)
