= Test de connaissance du français =

French language placement test

The Test de connaissance du français (TCF) is a language placement test for non-native speakers of French. It is administered by France Education International for France's Ministry of Education. It fulfils French language entry requirements, can be used to demonstrate language ability for job applications or for personal use, and is used by Canada or Québec for immigration procedures.

The TCF follows the European standards for language tests as set forward in the Common European Framework of Reference for Languages and is equal to DALF.

Lowest level is A1 indicating beginner, top fluency levels are C1 and C2.

Level C1 and C2 indicate advanced mastery of French. French university Sciences-Po uses TCF level C1 as the primary language prerequisite for evaluating the abilities of non-native speakers to follow academic discussions and carry out academic research in the French language.

The test is made up of compulsory and optional sections. The reading, listening and language structures sections are mandatory while the writing and speaking sections are optional.

== The compulsory examinations ==
These examinations consist of 80 multiple-choice questions in total, with progressive difficulty starting from level A1 to level C2 of the Common European Framework of Reference for Languages.

=== Listening comprehension ===
This category, which consists of a total of 40 questions to be answered in 40 minutes and carries a 360-point maximum score, aims to evaluate the test-taker's French-language listening comprehension skills. For CLB Level 7, the test taker must receive a score in the range of 249–279 in order to qualify:

- identify and understand the main information communicated in everyday conversations (dialogues, interviews, discussions, telephone conversations, etc.);
- identify the topic of a conversation;
- understand the main points of a spoken text on familiar topics encountered in a personal or professional environment.
- understand the main ideas in complex spoken texts on a concrete or abstract topic, familiar or unfamiliar;
- recognise a wide range of idiomatic expressions;
- understand any type of spoken language delivered at fast speed.

=== Use of language structures: grammar and vocabulary ===
This part consists of 20 questions and takes 20 minutes to complete. These questions test the ability of candidates to master the structure of the language, from basic to more complex communicative situations, by:

- identifying lexical or language register errors;
- choosing the equivalent of an expression or a grammatical term;
- selecting the correct formulations in accordance with a communicative situation.

=== Reading comprehension ===
This category has 40 multiple-choice questions (MCQs) with a time constraint of 60 minutes. The questions total 300 points. To receive a Canadian Language Benchmark 7 (CLB 7), the exam taker must receive a minimum of 207–232 points. The test taker is required to read the following instructions and select the best option from the list:

- familiar names, words and very simple sentences used in communication situations (or administrative messages and informal letters);
- the information in everyday materials (advertisements, prospectuses, menus and timetables, etc.);
- information about people, facts or events (personal letters);
- texts written in everyday language related to everyday life or work;
- articles and reports in which the authors take a stand on concrete and abstract topics;
- factual and literary texts, long and complex, specialized items;
- abstract or complex texts taken from books, scholarly articles, literary works.

== The optional examinations ==
=== Spoken expression ===
The spoken expression examination takes the form of a one-to-one interview with an examiner, which lasts for 15 minutes maximum. Preparation is not required for this examination. The questions are divided into six levels, from level A1 to level C2 of the Common European Framework of Reference for Languages. The interview is recorded and sent to the CIEP for centralized assessment after the examination.

The candidate is assessed on their ability to communicate and react to the cues given by the examiner. Candidates are asked to:

- describe places (home, work, etc.) and people;
- talk about their living conditions, and current, recent or future work or studies;
- describe experiences, events and plans;
- explain a plan or an idea, the plot of a book or film and express their reactions;
- explain the advantages and disadvantages of a plan, give their opinion, express their agreement and disagreement;
- present a clear and structured argument in a style appropriate to the context;
- present detailed and structured descriptions of complex topics, developing particular points and rounding off with a conclusion.

=== Written expression ===
This examination includes six exercises that get progressively more difficult, each of which corresponds to one of the six levels of the Common European Framework of Reference for Languages (level A1 to level C2). Candidates have 1 hour 45 minutes to complete this examination.

Description of the exercises:

- writing a simple message (approx. 40 words);
- writing a personal letter about everyday situations, using an everyday register (approx. 60 words);
- writing a report of experiences, a story, an account of an opinion (approx. 80 words);
- writing an explanatory text, which develops points of view and a line of argument (approx. 100 words);
- comparing two opinions and taking a stand on a general topic (100 to 125 words);
- rewording the main ideas in a document, account of a point of view with justifications (approx. 100 words).

Candidates are assessed on their ability to:

- follow the instructions given;
- communicate a message clearly;
- link ideas and show consistency in their views;
- express their opinion and provide justifications;
- use a range of vocabulary related to the task they have been requested to perform;
- show that they can use complex structures proficiently;
- show that they have the ability to synthesise;
- reword in their own words.

== Test scores ==
TCF scores are ranked on 6 levels, ranging from A1 to C2 of the Common European Framework of Reference for Languages.

A1	A2	B1	B2	C1	C2
100-199	200-299	300-399	400-499	500-599	600–699

== Assessment of the scores ==
When it comes to the immigration test, TEF Canada] is evaluated using CLB levels, which range from 4 to 10. These levels assess proficiency based on the applicant's scores and level of achievement. The following is a detailed scoring chart:

CLB LEVEL	Reading (CE)	Writing (PE)	Listening (CO)	Speaking (PO)
10	264-277	393-415	316-333	393-415
9	248-263	371-392	298-315	371-392
8	233-247	349-370	280-297	349-370
7	207-232	310-348	249-279	310-348
6	181-206	271-309	217-248	271-309
5	151-180	226-270	181-216	226-270
4	121-150	181-225	145-180	181-225

The TCF Canada] (Test de connaissance du français pour le Canada is another standardized examination used to evaluate French language proficiency for immigration purposes. Recognized by Immigration, Refugees and Citizenship Canada (IRCC), it is accepted as official evidence of language ability for applications for permanent residency and Canadian citizenship.

The following is a detailed scoring chart for the TCF Canada:

CLB LEVEL	Reading (CE)	Writing (PE)	Listening (CO)	Speaking (PO)
10	549-699	16-20	549-699	16-20
9	524-548	14-15	523-548	14-15
8	499-523	12-13	503-522	12-13
7	453-498	10-11	458-502	10-11
6	406-452	7-8	398-457	7-8
5	375-405	6	369-397	6
4	342-374	4-5	331-368	4-5

The TCF Canada reading and listening sections are structured with a progressive question weighting system in which marks increase according to item difficulty. Early questions typically carry lower point values, while later questions are assigned higher values to reflect greater linguistic complexity. This format is designed to assess a wide range of proficiency levels, from basic comprehension to advanced interpretation skills. The total score for each section is calculated based on the cumulative weighting of all items, contributing to the candidate’s overall proficiency result.

The following is a detailed question weight distribution chart for the reading and listening sections of the TCF Canada:

Question	Marks
1-4	3 marks each
5-10	9 marks each
11-19	15 marks each
20-29	21 marks each
30-35	26 marks each
36-39	33 marks each
	699 total
