= Diplôme approfondi de langue française =

Diploma of French-language abilities

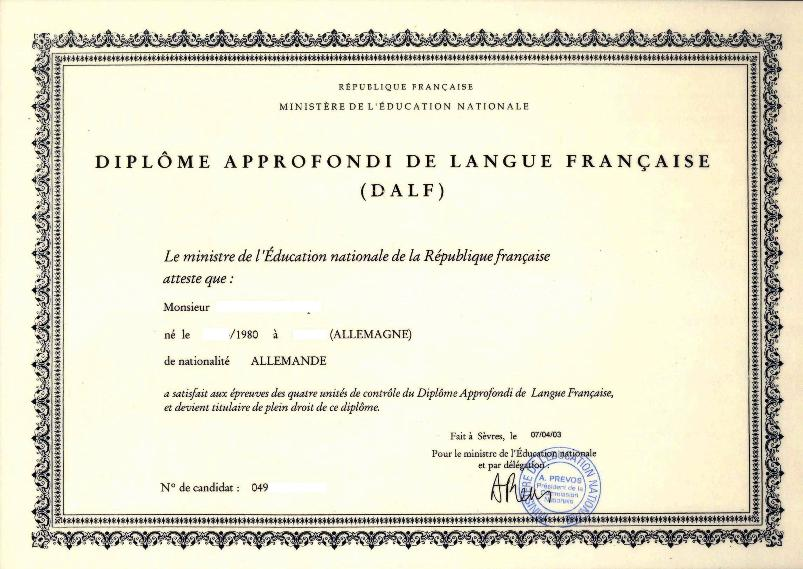
Diplôme approfondi de langue française

The Diplôme approfondi de langue française (English: Diploma in Advanced French Language), or DALF for short, is a diploma of French language abilities for non-native French speakers. It is administered by France Education International for France's Ministry of Education and composed of two independent diplomas corresponding to the top two levels C1 and C2 of the Common European Framework of Reference for Languages. Diplomas are valid for life and do not expire.

Level C2 is the highest level attainable according to this framework, denoting mastery and proficiency in the French language.

The "basic" and "independent" divisions of language proficiency are certified by the Diplôme d'études en langue française (DELF) levels A1 to B2.

== Exams ==
=== DALF C1 ===
Language users at DALF C1 are independent. They can express themselves fluently and spontaneously. They have a large vocabulary and can choose the appropriate expression to introduce their comments. They can produce clear, well-structured discourse without hesitation and which shows controlled use of structures.

The DALF C1 exam consists of four parts. Each part is graded from zero to 25 points, for a total of 100 points. A minimum of 50 points, as well as at least 5 points per part, is required to pass the exam.

1. Oral comprehension (40 minutes)
2. Written comprehension (50 minutes)
3. Written production, consisting of a synthesis and an essay (2 hours 30 minutes)
4. Oral production, consisting of a presentation and a discussion with the jury based on a text (30 minutes; 1 hour preparation time)

=== DALF C2 ===
DALF C2 users' proficiency in the language is illustrated by precision, appropriateness and fluency of expression. C2 candidates are capable of using the language for business, academic and other advanced-level purposes.

The DALF C2 exam consists of two parts. Each part is graded from zero to 50 points, for a total of 100 points. A minimum of 50 points, as well as at least 10 points per part, is required to pass the exam.

1. Oral comprehension and production, consisting of a presentation and a discussion with the jury, based on a recording of 15 minutes listened to twice (30 minutes; 1 hour preparation time)
2. Written comprehension and production, consisting of the composition of a structured text based on a file of documents of about 2,000 words (3 hours 30 minutes)
