= Test in Swedish for University Studies =

Swedish language proficiency test

TISUS (Test i svenska för universitets- och högskolestudier, or Test in Swedish for University Studies) is an official exam of proficiency in the Swedish language for students applying to study at Swedish universities.

The test consists of three components: reading, writing, and speaking. The reading and writing components are written while the speaking component consists of a discussion and an individual task.

Two scores are given: pass (godkänd) and fail (underkänd). A candidate must pass all three components to receive a passing grade. If one component is failed, it can be repeated within a year.
