= Community colleges in the United States =

Public, two-year colleges

In the United States, community colleges are primarily two-year public institutions of tertiary education. Community colleges offer undergraduate education in the form of an associate degree. In addition, community colleges also offer remedial education, GEDs, high school diplomas, technical diplomas and tech certificates, and occasionally, at some colleges, a limited number of 4-year bachelor's degrees. After graduating from a community college, some students transfer to a four-year college or university to continue their studies leading to a bachelor's degree. Community college is tuition-free for selected students in 47 states, often under the name College Promise. Most community college instructors have advanced degrees but serve as part-time low wage employees.

Community college enrollment has declined every year since 2010. According to the National Student Clearinghouse, the total decline in enrollment from 2010 to 2020 was more than 2.2 million students. The largest enrollment drop occurred in 2020, the latest year surveyed.

== Terminology and control ==
Before the 1970s, community colleges were often referred to as junior colleges, and that term is still used at some institutions and for athletics, specifically the NJCAA. However, the term "junior college" is now usually used to characterize private two-year institutions. The term "community college" has evolved to describe publicly funded two-year institutions. The main national advocacy organization for community colleges, which was founded in 1920 as the "American Association of Junior Colleges", and by 1992 had changed its name to the "American Association of Community Colleges".

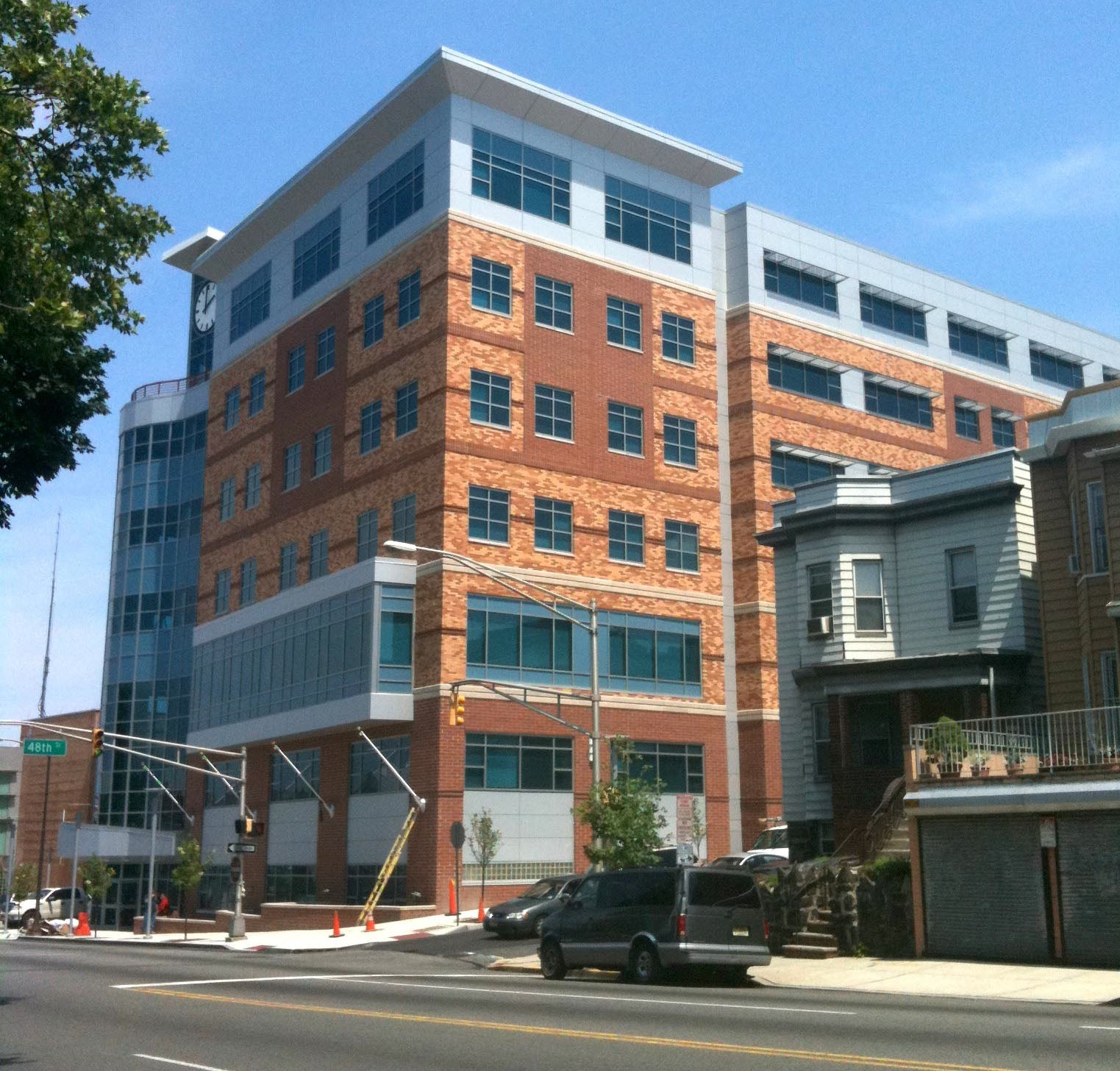
Hudson County Community College in Union City, NJ.

Cohen and Brawer noted other names: city college, county college (in New Jersey), and branch campus. Other common components of the school name include vocational, technical, adult education and technical institute. Nicknames include "democracy's college" and "opportunity college".

In several California cities, community colleges are often called "city colleges", since they are municipally funded and designed to serve the needs of the residents of the city in which they are situated. However, the state's public two-year colleges are not solely found in its larger cities.

New York City's network of community colleges was established outside of the CUNY (City University of New York) system, and they integrated into that system at the insistence of the state government. Another example is Westchester Community College. In the late 1940s, the county operated a popular vocational institute. The New York state government required that the county transform its technical institute into a community college. The county government resisted this transformation, as it would be responsible for a third of the new institution's operating costs (in contrast, the state paid for all of the technical institute's operating costs). After a series of very heated meetings, fully reported in the local press, the county was forced to conform to the state government's wishes.

The origins, purposes, and funding of public two-year colleges varies widely among the states and, as in California, within states. Because the role played by rural community colleges in preparing excess rural youth for productive careers in urban centers is not well understood by policy makers, these smaller institutions do not receive sufficient state funding to offset their weak tax bases and, because of their relatively small size, they bear much higher per-student costs when compared to urban community colleges. This inequity in basic institutional funding has led to the creation of such organizations as the Community Colleges of Appalachia and the tribal college association, which have sought to promote more equitable funding irrespective of an institution's size or location.

== Tuition free community college (College Promise) ==
Community college tuition is free in 47 states to qualified individuals, through College Promise programs.

== Adjunct faculty and contingent workers ==
Adjunct faculty, a form of contingent workers, make up most of the instructional staff at community colleges. Adjunct pay ranges from about $1,397 to about $3,000 per course. While the community college instructional staff is diverse, some community college professors are "freeway flyers" who work at multiple campuses to make a living. Most adjunct faculty have limited autonomy and input, and are provided a limited amount of resources. Poor pay for adjuncts and a lack of job stability leads to faculty turnover. One in four families of part-time college faculty are enrolled in at least one public assistance program, such as food stamps, Medicaid, or the Earned Income Tax Credit. Adjuncts report feeling disconnected from college life and have "limited awareness of campus initiatives and resources."

Year	Employees / Instructional Staff
2012	792,426
2013	764,947
2014	751,469
2015	731,489
2016	695,688
2017	675,191
2018	657,739
2019	641,391

== Student demographics ==
According to the American Association of Community Colleges, the race and ethnic backgrounds of community college students taking credit are: 41 percent white, 27 percent Hispanic, 13 percent black, 6 percent Asian/Pacific Islander, and 1 percent Native American. The mean and median ages of community college students are 28 years of age and 24 years of age respectively. Thirty-five percent of students are attending full time and 65 percent are part-time. Twenty-nine percent are first generation students, fifteen percent of students are single parents, 20 percent have a disability, 9 percent are non-citizens, and 5 percent are military veterans. About 80 percent of community college students have jobs, and about 40 percent work full-time.

=== Socioeconomic status ===
Research by Sara Goldrick-Rab and others found that more than half of all community-college students surveyed struggle with food insecurity. A follow-up study found more than a third of college students don't always have enough to eat and lack stable housing. Nine percent of those surveyed were homeless.

== History ==
=== Early community colleges ===
Before 1850, a few public institutions offered two years of college: Lasell Junior College in Auburndale, Massachusetts, and Vincennes University of Vincennes, Indiana. Helland cites a section from the 1899 Vincennes University catalog: "The Vincennes University occupies a unique position in the educational field. It is half-way between the commissioned high school and the full-fledged college: it is in fact a junior college."

Many early community colleges were "normal schools" that prepared school teachers. Primary emphasis was placed on traditional middle class values and developing responsible citizens. As an example, Normal Schools began in the State of Massachusetts in the 1880s as extensions of local high schools. They originated to meet the need for teacher preparation. In Saint Joseph, Missouri, a Normal School was added to the local high school to provide a career track for women who wanted to teach. Mr. Whiteford, the area's district superintendent, inquired of the University of Missouri to determine if credits from Saint Joseph Normal School could transfer into a baccalaureate program. The University's president, Dr. Hill, acknowledged the request and provided for the articulation. Coincidentally, Dr. Hill was actively involved in the American Association of Universities and calling for the establishment of junior colleges for this purpose.

In Minnesota, St. Paul's Public School District established a "City Training School" for preparing teachers. The 1883 school's mission was to provide certified teachers and substitutes for the district. Mrs. M. E. Jenness from the Normal School at River Falls, Wisconsin, was the St. Paul School's first principal; Mrs. N. F. Wheaton was the Director of Practice. Wheaton had been employed at the Oshkosh Normal School in Wisconsin. In Minneapolis, a Normal Training School was instituted in the fall of 1887. Miss Adele Evers of Manchester Normal School in New Hampshire was appointed the first teacher; she was one of six candidates for the position. Evers' references included work at Martha's Vineyard and Saratoga.

Baltimore's Manual Training High School opened in 1884, was the first separate secondary school for education that was specifically work-oriented. The Maryland institution was unique as a stand-alone campus. Other examples of sub-baccalaureate programs were the University Preparatory School and Junior College of Tonkawa. The result of the two-year schools founded in Oklahoma Public School Secondary System in 1902, both institutions later merged in 1914 and became the Oklahoma Institute of Technology. Dean Schneider of the University of Cincinnati developed an alternative high school with a cooperative plan where students spent one week in an occupation and the other in school. Industry provided the shop experiences and the classroom facilitated the academic. There were also non-cooperative high schools; two examples were the Girl's Vocational High School in Kansas City, Missouri and the Delgado Trade School in New Orleans. A two-year, terminal education, was seen as more socially efficient for students who could advance past high school but not continue to attain bachelor's degrees. This national vocational movement gave junior colleges a target population, but numerous students wanted more than a semiprofessional education; many maintained a desire to transfer. Throughout this time period, there was a move for more public two-year institutions along with a trend to separate from high schools and affiliate with higher education. With the change in affiliation came a new status which encouraged junior colleges to develop additional credibility through the creation of professional criteria and use of scientific methods.

Brint and Karabel conclude that "The two-year college has been a distinctively American creation, and nowhere else has it attained such prominence."J. L. Ratcliff suggests one perspective for the emergence of two-year post secondary institutions of the past century: they began in the private sector after the Panic of 1893. At that time of severe financial hardship J. M. Carroll, president of Baylor University, made a pragmatic suggestion to solve the problem of too many Baptist colleges with insufficient funds and not enough students to support them: reduce the smaller Baptist colleges' curriculum to the freshman and sophomore years. After this preliminary period, Baylor University accepted the two-year students and provided the junior and senior years of their academic plan. Carroll hoped this split would require fewer faculty and resources for the first two years of higher education.

In the larger cities early public community colleges were often an extension of high schools, like the first established, Joliet Junior College, in Illinois in 1901. These initial community colleges generally were small (usually fewer than 200 students) and focused on a liberal arts education with the goal of transferring students to four-year colleges. They reflected high school needs and lacked a definite identity. These examples of two-year structure innovations with transfer missions in the private and public sector provided a pragmatic approach for the preservation of existing institutions.

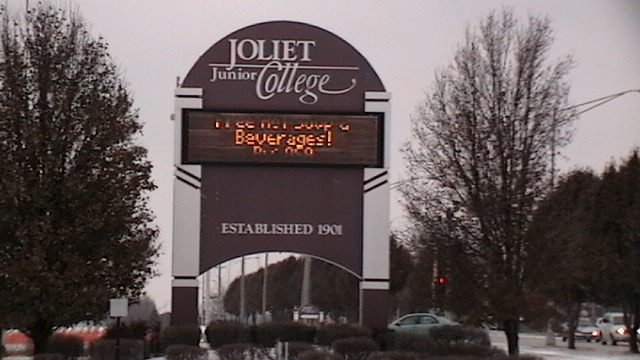
Joliet Junior College, in Joliet, Illinois, established in 1901 by William Rainey Harper and J. Stanley Brown.

Junior colleges grew in number from 20 in 1909 to 170 in 1919. By 1922, 37 states had set up 70 junior colleges, enrolling about 150 students each. Meanwhile, another 137 were privately operated, with about 60 students each. Rapid expansion continued in the 1920s, with 440 junior colleges in 1930 enrolling about 70,000 students.

Many factors contributed to rapid growth of community colleges. Students parents and businessmen wanted nearby, low-cost schools to provide training for the growing white collar labor force and for more advanced technical blue collar jobs. Four-year colleges were also growing, but not as fast; however many were located in rural or small-town areas away from the fast-growing metropolis.

Several different movements supported the creation of community colleges, including local community support of public and private two-year institutions, the expansion of the public education system, increased professional standards for teachers, the vocational education movement, and an expanding demand for adult and community education. Numerous colleges and universities advocated for the development of junior colleges. Leadership felt small, private liberal arts colleges and high schools could provide the first two years of college while larger universities could focus resources on research and junior and senior level students.

=== Depression era ===
During the 1920s and 1930s there was a shift in the purpose of community colleges to developing a workforce, which was influenced by wide unemployment during the Great Depression. Developing "semiprofessionals" became dominant national language to describe junior college students. The notion that engineers and supervisors make primary decisions about what and how activities were to be done in the workplace provided the origins for employees needed to carry out their decisions. This need for a class of workers to implement the decisions of the theoreticians demanded an educational delivery system other than the traditional four-year college or university. The closed shop of the artisan which had initially provided workers was no longer the educational program of choice. Nationally, a new two-year vehicle for educating the industrial worker found its launching within the secondary public school system under the leadership of local school districts.

=== Cold War era ===
After World War II, the G.I. Bill afforded more educational opportunity to veterans which resulted in increased enrollments. Another factor that led to growth was the rise of adult and community education. After World War II, community colleges were seen as a good place to house continuing education programs. The 1947 President's Commission on Higher Education was an important national document for community colleges. It established a network of public community colleges that would provide education to a diverse group of students at little or no cost along with serving community needs through a comprehensive mission.

The peak year for private institutions came in 1949, when there were 322 junior colleges; 180 were affiliated with churches, 108 were independent non-profit, and 34 were private schools run for-profit.

This national network exploded in the 1960s with 457 community colleges and the enrollment of baby boomers. A series of grants through the Kellogg Junior College Leadership Programs helped train many community college leaders during this decade.

Merritt College, a junior college (and now a community college) in Oakland, California, was the site for organizing and educating members of the Black Panthers in the mid- to late-1960s.

In the 1970s, growth continued when many enrolled to escape the Vietnam era draft. The 1970s also marked a shift to faculty development, including more instructional training for the unique student body and mission of community colleges. In 1976, Coastline Community College was launched as the first "college without walls", using television, a precursor today's online programs as well as using community facilities. As a result of budget struggles, community colleges relied more on part-time instructors, which made up 50 to 60 percent of the faculty by 1980. During the 1980s, community colleges began to work more closely with high schools to prepare students for vocational and technical two-year programs.

By the end of the 20th century, two-year community colleges were playing important roles in higher education as access mechanisms. They became an integral feature for those persons who were attending higher education for the first time or as non-traditional students. Brint and Karabel have recognized the change that transpired from 1920 when fewer than 2 percent of all college freshmen were enrolled in a two-year college to the late 1980s when over 50 percent were matriculated. Junior colleges once located in high schools had left their origins to develop their own campuses and were called community colleges and still retained the transfer access mission. High school normal schools matured into teacher colleges or colleges of education within universities offering bachelor and graduate degrees. Industrial institutes integrated with local junior colleges to make these campus's programs more comprehensive community colleges. Along with this growth and legitimization of two-year mechanisms for the delivery of higher education, the emergence of two-year institutions provided an epistemological debate that divided the river of education flowing into the early 20th century into three streams of educational natures. "In the process of this struggle and adjustment some colleges will grow stronger, some will become academies, some junior colleges; the high schools will be elevated to a still more important position than that which they now occupy. The general result will be the growth of a system in the higher educational work of the United States, where now no system exists."

=== 1990s and 2000s ===
In recent years, a debate between the advocates and critics of community colleges gained strength. Advocates argued that community colleges served the needs of society by providing college opportunity to students who otherwise cannot go to college, training and retraining mid-level skilled workers, and preserving the academic excellence of four-year universities. Critics argued that community colleges continued a culture of privilege through training business workers at public expense, not allowing the working class to advance in social class, protecting selective admissions at four-year institutions for the nation's elite, and discouraging transfer through cooling out. In 1998, 64 percent of community college faculty were part-time workers.

Although the growth of community colleges has stabilized, enrollment continued to outgrow four-year institutions. A total of 1,166 loosely linked community colleges face challenges of new technological innovations, distance learning, funding constraints, community pressure, and international influence. Some of the issues currently faced are explored in community college resources compiled by the Association for Career and Technical Education.

During the Great Recession (2007–2009), community colleges faced state budget cuts amid increases in enrollment, and community colleges raised student tuition. With enrollments decreasing, lower budgets at community colleges continued with increasing reliance on adjunct professors, who were paid less, typically received few employment benefits, and faced greater uncertainty of continued employment semester to semester.

=== 2010s: the Great Recession and austerity ===
In the 2010s, funding for community colleges faced scrutiny as state budgets were tightened. Because higher education budgets are considered discretionary expenses, they have been more likely targets for cuts than K–12 education or Medicaid. In 2014, however, the state of Tennessee and the city of Chicago, Illinois began programs for free community college.

In 2015, President Barack Obama proposed making community college tuition free to many residents of the United States. The plan, called "America’s College Promise", rekindled a nationwide conversation on community colleges and the funding of higher education in general. The proposed program would have had states contribute a portion of the funding and would have covered tuition only; non-tuition items (e.g., textbooks, supplies, transportation, and room and board) would not have been covered. However, key Republican lawmakers, including John Boehner and Mitch McConnell publicly opposed the legislation.

By 2015, two states took measures to provide free community college tuition. "Oregon now is poised to follow Tennessee as the second state with a plan on the books to provide free two-year college." The Oregon Promise, similar to America's College Promise, will provide free community college to students who meet certain eligibility requirements. According to Fain, the legislation will cost Oregon $10 million per year to pay for tuition costs that state and federal aid doesn't cover. Thanks to a large increase in funding for higher education, Oregon is able to financially afford the costs of providing free community college to students.

Tennessee currently has the Tennessee Promise, but this initiative does not receive its funding in the same way in which President Obama wanted to fund U.S. College Promise (Mangan & Supiano, 2015). Following in the footsteps of Tennessee and Oregon was Illinois. The Community College of Philadelphia and Harper College in Illinois announced plans to provide free two-year community college experiences to students.

== Timeline of important events ==
1917: Smith–Hughes Act or National Vocational Education Act

1920: American Association of Junior Colleges established.

1930: First publication of the Community College Journal.

1944: Passage of the Federal G.I. Bill of Rights

1947: Publication of Higher Education for American Democracy by the President's Commission on Higher Education (the 1947 Truman Commission).

1965: Higher Education Act of 1965 established grant programs to make higher education more accessible.

1992: The American Association of Junior Colleges changed their name to the American Association of Community Colleges.

== Governance ==
Federal governance

The Community College of the Air Force, which exclusively trains enlisted United States Air Force and United States Space Force personnel, is governed as a unit of the Air Force's Air University.

State governance

The higher education governance structure landscape in the United States is very diverse; they are not intended to be precise organization charts. According to the Education Commission of the States there are three major types of higher education governance systems in the states; they are Governing Board States, Coordinating Board States and Planning/ Regulatory/Service Agency States.

Governing board states (GBS)

State-level governing boards are distinguished according to whether they are responsible for consolidated systems or multi-campus systems. Consolidated systems are composed of several previously independently governed institutions that were later consolidated into one system. Multi-campus systems developed primarily through extensions of various branches or campuses.

Coordinating board states

Coordinating boards vary significantly in formal authority and informal power and influence from state to state. Generally, there is a state level board governing universities, colleges, and community colleges. Each university and community college district will have its own board that is accountable to a state-coordinating agency.

The Planning/Regulatory/Service Agency States (PRSA)

The PRSA states have limited or non-existent formal governing or coordinating authority, which carry out regulatory and service functions such as student financial aid.

For a comprehensive list of American community colleges and their state level governing boards: U.S. Community Colleges by State, University of Texas at Austin

A more thorough description of state level college and university governance models can be found at: Models of Postsecondary Education Coordination and Governance in the States

Local governance

Most community colleges are operated within special districts that draw property tax revenue from the local community, as a division of a state university, or as a sister institution within a statewide higher education system.

In all cases, community colleges are governed by a board of trustees, appointed by the state governor, or the board is elected by citizens residing within the community college district. In some instances, as with the City Colleges of Chicago, the board of trustees is appointed by the presiding local government. In Chicago, it is the mayor who appoints the board.

Depending on the operational system, the board of trustees may directly govern the college or may govern the college through a university or system-level office. Depending upon the locus of control, the board may or may not be subject to control by a state agency that supervises all community college districts or all higher education institutions within the state.

The board of trustees selects a president or chancellor of the community college to serve as the chief executive officer and lead the faculty and staff.

Multi-college district

Multi-college community college districts include several individually accredited community colleges within one district. Each college is independent with distinct local administration, but they share a single board of trustees and report to a non-instructional central administrative office.

The Contra Costa Community College District is an example of one of the largest multi-college community college districts in California. The District consists of Contra Costa College, Diablo Valley College, Los Medanos College, San Ramon Campus, and Brentwood Center, and annually serves almost 62,000 students.

Multi-campus district

Larger schools implement a multi-campus system and generally share a single accreditation. Local administrative governance varies. Extension campuses report to the main campus administration or a central administrative office. A good example of this is College of DuPage in Glen Ellyn, Illinois, which has 6 satellite campuses within a 10-mile area, in addition to its main campus, which itself has 9 structures and an enrollment of over 30,000 students.

Faculty governance

Faculty senates and councils

A faculty senate, or faculty council as this body is sometimes referred to, is the representative body of all faculty who participate in the governance processes of the community college. As with all governing bodies, the faculty senate is usually governed by a constitution and a set of bylaws specific to the college. Membership in this body varies from college, with most restricting voting rights to tenured and tenure track faculty, and others allowing a wider array of members to include full-time, adjunct, continuing education, technical, and adult basic education faculty.

Though this is not an exhaustive list, the mission of the faculty senate at the community college usually includes: matters concerning curricular decisions; strengthening the concept of the faculty as a college entity; promoting the gathering, exchanging, and disseminating of faculty views and concerns regarding college matters; promoting mutual accountability between the college faculty and the faculty representative to any college committee; advising the Chancellor and other administrators of faculty views on college matters; bringing the concerns of the Chancellor and other administrators on college matters to the faculty; promoting the involvement of all faculty members in the establishing, staffing, and functioning of college committees, task forces, or other initiatives; and participating in the policy review process of the college.

Labor unions and collective bargaining units/agreements

Most community college faculty are bargained for employees. While unions and their respective collective bargaining agreements serve to protect faculty rights and working conditions, collective bargaining agreements, or union contracts, provide faculty with a defined set of rules and regulations they must follow as a condition of employment.

Collective bargaining swept into higher education on the coattails of legislation authorizing public employees to negotiate. As these laws were passed in various states in the 1960s and 1970s, employee groups ranging from refuse collectors to prison guards gained union representation and began negotiating contracts.

Collective bargaining units exist for all divisions of community college faculty; however, participation by faculty groups differs from college to college.

The following labor unions represent community college faculty and staff:

- American Federation of Teachers (AFT)
- National Education Association (NEA)
- Service Employees International Union (including Faculty Forward)

Student governance

There is a student government organizational presence on close to every community college campus in America The Student Government organization is the official voice of the student body, a vital link in effective student participation in all areas of student concern in relationship to the college's administration. By advocating student rights and services, the organization represents the student body and presents its concerns to the college administration, local, and national issues. Through the Student Government organizations the college provides students with essential leadership experience, and valuable connections with faculty, staff administration, students, and the board of trustees. Student involvement is usually based on criteria set by the institution; all students have the right as a student to participate in democratic process on campus. (from ASGA's entry of Bakersfield College)

Shared governance

Shared governance is the set of practices under which college faculty and staff participates in significant decisions concerning the operation of their institutions. Colleges are institutions with a mission—the creation and dissemination of ideas. At the heart of shared governance is the belief that decision-making should be largely independent of short-term managerial and political considerations. Faculty and professional staff are in the best position to shape and implement curriculum and research policy, to select academic colleagues and judge their work; and The perspective of all front-line personnel is invaluable in making sound decisions about allocating resources, setting goals, choosing top officers and guiding student life.

For a more detailed explanation of governance at the community college, please see the AAUP's 1966 Statement on Government of Colleges and Universities and the 1998 statement on the same topic by the Association of Governing Boards of Universities and Colleges. These documents more clearly define those matters that are the responsibility of the voting faculty and those reserved to the governing body and its delegates.

== Enrollment ==
Year	Enrollment	Percent change
2010	7,030,516	n/a
2011	6,918,915	−1.6
2012	6,706,913	−1.7
2013	6,329,631	−3.3
2014	6,052,069	−4.4
2015	5,906,419	−2.4
2016	5,721,676	−2.6
2017	5,624,282	−1.7
2018	5,445,562	−3.2
2019	5,368,470	−1.4
2020	4,824,204	−10.1

In the United States, community colleges operate under "open admissions" policies. That is, anyone with a high school diploma or GED may attend, regardless of academic status or college entrance exam scores. Students however do take placement tests before enrolling, because not all courses are open admission. In California and Minnesota, students reaching age 18 are not required to have completed secondary education, but they must show an "ability to benefit" from a college's educational program. Under certain circumstances, community colleges also accept high school students or dropouts.

The open admission policy results in a wide range of students attending community college classes. Students range in age from teenagers in high school taking classes under a concurrent, or dual, enrollment policy (which allows both high school and college credits to be earned simultaneously) to working adults taking classes at night to complete a degree or gain additional skills in their field to students with graduate degrees who enroll to become more employable or to pursue lifelong interests. "Reverse transfers" (or those transferring from a university) constitute one of the fastest growing new community college cohorts.

One threat to enrollment at community colleges has been the increasing popularity of for-profit e-learning and online universities. Many community colleges have supplemented their offerings with online courses to stave off competition from exclusively e-learning schools. For example, Northern Virginia Community College's Extended Learning Institute has been offering distance learning courses for thirty-five years. Texas offers the Virtual College of Texas whereby a student at any community college in the state can attend classes from any of the state's 51 community colleges or four Texas State Technical College campuses, paying local tuition plus a VCT fee of around $40.

The Maricopa County Community College District in the Phoenix, Arizona, metropolitan area, is the largest community college district in the United States in terms of enrollment.

California has the lowest community college enrollment fees in the nation, currently set at $46 per unit for state residents.

In terms of enrollment demographics, according to the American Association of Community Colleges (2015), 46% of all U.S. undergraduates are community college students. Other representations are as follows: first generation-41%, Native American-61%, Hispanic-57%, black-52% and Asian/Pacific Islander-43%. While 50% of students are white at community colleges, that is 10% lower compared to 4-year institutions and a greater percentage exists of every non-white group at community colleges. More than half of Native American, Hispanic, and black undergraduates are enrolled in community colleges, rather than 4-year institutions, a testament to their service to underrepresented populations. The average age of student is 28 compared to the 24-year-old 4-year institution average. Nearly 50% of students fall between the ages of 22–39, a much higher age range than the 4-year institutions. There are slightly more women, 57%, than men, which may be attributed to the greater number of students with children and the women who return to school after becoming a stay-at-home mother (17% of students are single parents). 60% of students are enrolled in credit coursework, seeking degrees, while the other 40% is pursuing certifications.

Over 70% of students apply for any kind of financial aid, while only 58% receive aid. This only increases the number of student's requiring some form of employment. When it comes to employment status the two highest populations are full-time students with part-time jobs and part-time students with full-time jobs. This is likely due to the necessity of work/school balance. As Katz and Davison (2014) state, "community college students are more likely to be working class, ethnic minorities, over age 25, and from less educated families than traditional university students". Despite the added barriers and obstacles faced by community college students, research has found that these same students possess high aspirations, and have shown self-initiative, and resilience.

Among four-year institutions, transfer students have better outcomes at public institutions, very selective institutions, and institutions with students of higher SES. Average Bachelor's completion rates are 10% higher for students that transferred to public four-year institutions than those who transferred to private non-profit four-year institutions. Community college students who transferred to very selective four-year institutions had bachelor's completion rates that were on average 36 percentage points higher than those of students who transferred to non-selective institutions.

== Revenue sources ==
- State funding $23.0 billion (32.4 percent)
- Tuition $15.5 billion (21.8 percent)
- Local $15.2 billion (21.4 percent)
- Federal $13.1 billion (18.5 percent)
- Other $4.2 billion (5.9 percent)

== Educational offerings ==
Community colleges generally offer a range of programs. The majority of programs are offered on campus, however, distance and online educational opportunities have become increasingly common. Virtually all community colleges offer courses and programs online.

=== Remedial education ===
According to the Center for Community College Student Engagement, 68 percent of community college students require remedial coursework.

=== Associate degree ===
In study towards an associate degree, a student takes necessary courses needed to earn a degree that will allow for entry into jobs requiring some level of college education but not a full four-year degree.

The associate degree program also allows students who wish to eventually obtain a bachelor's degree at a four-year college to complete the necessary "core" requirements to attend the college of their choice. Some states have mandated that the community college's curriculum be structured so as to satisfy "core curriculum" requirements at the state's public universities or private universities.

Many community colleges have articulation arrangements with nearby four-year institutions, where a student obtaining an associate degree in a field will automatically have his/her classes counted toward the bachelor's degree requirement. For example, a community college associate degree in hotel and restaurant management, computers or accounting would count toward the four-year school's core requirement for a Business Administration degree. Some have gone one step further by arrangements with a four-year college for the student to obtain the bachelor's degree from the four-year college while taking all the courses via distance learning or other non-traditional modes, thus reducing the number of physical visits to the four-year school. One such example is College of DuPage (COD) in Illinois, who have implemented a program called 3+1. In this program, students can take three years of classes at the community college taught by COD professors and faculty, and in the fourth year attend classes on the COD campus, but taught by professors of nearby partner universities, such as Benedictine University, Concordia University Chicago, Governors State University, Lewis University, and Roosevelt University.

=== Certification ===
Certification in an area of training (such as nursing, computer repair, allied health, law enforcement, firefighting, or welding), which require preparation for a state or national examination, or where certification would allow for hiring preference or a higher salary upon entering the workforce. These courses are often geared toward the needs of the local or area business community.

=== Local services ===
Services of local interest to members of the community, such as job placement, adult continuing education classes (either for personal achievement or to maintain certification in specialized fields), and developmental classes for children. Some community colleges offer opportunities for high school dropouts to return to school and earn a high school diploma or obtain a GED.

=== Bachelor's degrees ===
A growing trend in the United States is for community colleges to begin offering bachelor's degrees. As of 2013, nineteen states have authorized their community colleges to offer bachelor's degrees with California passing authorizing legislation in 2014.

Many large community colleges, such as Miami-Dade College and St. Petersburg College in Florida, have dropped the words "community" or "junior" from their names as they have added bachelor's degree programs in limited fields and have started their evolution into four-year colleges while retaining their local commitments. Even some smaller community colleges, such as Northern New Mexico College in Española, New Mexico, have dropped community from their names and now offer six or more bachelor's degrees. A few of the larger institutions, such as De Anza College in northern California and College of DuPage near Chicago, who both boast enrollment of over 25,000 students, continue to explore the cost-benefit analysis in offering 4-year degrees. In more rural communities, community colleges may host branches of the local state university, and community colleges with specialized programs may offer four-year degrees in conjunction with other schools, some miles away. For instance, Southern Illinois University offers aviation management bachelor's degrees at Mt. San Antonio College and Palomar College in Southern California.

== Transfer to four-year colleges ==
Many four-year colleges (usually near the community college) have made arrangements, known as articulation agreements, allowing associate degrees to qualify for transfer, some cases allowing the student to complete the bachelor's degree via distance learning from the community college campus. Some states have passed rules whereby certain associate degrees in a field will automatically transfer to state universities as the core curriculum for specified bachelor's degrees.

States that have facilitated transfers include Minnesota, Alabama, Oregon, North Carolina, Illinois, Texas, and California. Minnesota, Alabama, and Oregon have created a statewide "transfer curriculum" allowing credits to be transferred to any other public university and almost all of the private colleges. The North Carolina system has a similar agreement, whereby specific courses are designated for mandatory transfer credit to all statewide public four-year institutions. Illinois's I-transfer program aids students in transferring credits across the state. California has a system known as Assist, which labels course equivalencies between all California Community Colleges and California public four-year colleges. Texas has a similar system known as TCCN for labelling course equivalencies between all Texas Community Colleges and Texas public four-year institutions.

In the absence of transfer arrangements established by the schools or by the states, transferring credits can sometimes be a problem, as each four-year college has its own requirements for enrollment.

== Advantages of community colleges ==
- Community colleges are often the most inexpensive route to a college education. Sometimes college is tuition free and students can save money by staying home while attending college. Average annual tuition and fees for community college are $3,770 versus $10,560 for a public four-year college.
- Community colleges emphasize the needs of local students and the local job market. Students who could not afford campus or off-site housing at a four-year college, or for other reasons cannot relocate, can attend courses while staying in their local community (though some colleges do offer student housing). They can also benefit university graduates, since some four-year schools fail to prepare their graduates for the kinds of jobs that are available in their surrounding regions. Over eight percent of the nation's community college students already possess a bachelor's degree.
- Although an associate degree is usually less financially lucrative in the long term than a bachelor's degree, it can provide a respectable income at much less cost in time, tuition, student loans, and lost earnings, along with the option of upgrading to a bachelor's degree at a later time. Even ten years after graduation, there are many people with certificates and associate degrees in fields where they earn more money than the average B.A. holder. There is still a demand for some skilled trades that do not require a bachelor's degree, such as paralegals, police officers, mechanics, electricians, and technicians.
- Community college professors may be solely dedicated to teaching, and classes may be small. In comparison, a large university college course may be taught to 300+ students by a teaching assistant, while the professor attends to research duties. Outside of those teaching in the technical and vocational fields, most instructors at community colleges have master's degrees and many hold doctoral degrees. In addition, community college professors can help students achieve their goals, work more closely with them, and offer them support, while at four-year colleges and universities, a professor is also often expected to conduct academic research, and in some cases, to mentor graduate students.
- Some community colleges have athletic programs; certain colleges serve as incubators for college athletes, particularly in baseball, basketball and football. A talented player who would not meet the academic or athletic standards of a major college program may be able to play for two years in junior college, establishing an academic record in the process, and then transfer to the major college.
- Community colleges offer more academic flexibility than traditional four-year colleges and universities by giving students the opportunity to take more night classes and online courses. This is especially important for students that have to work, or have family obligations, while pursuing a degree. For those students that have to work or want to ease their way into higher education, community college allows them to move at their own pace.
- Federal and private financial aid is available to community college students. Federal student loans require students to only be enrolled half time – usually six credit hours or two college courses. In order for community college students to keep their financial aid, they just need to make sure they do not drop out of school. Private loans are also beginning to become options for community college students. Private lenders are also beginning to offer loans for students attending two-year colleges and technical schools.
- The science, technology, engineering, and mathematics, otherwise known as STEM, field is growing at a fast pace. Many careers in the STEM field are in high demand, and numerous community colleges have associate degree programs to help students with that first step in their college career. According to the Center on Education and the Workforce at Georgetown University, STEM majors are the highest paying, with an average salary of $65,000 or more annually over the course of a recipient’s career.

Effective and passionate instructors can provide remedial students with social capital, leading them to services such as tutoring and counseling. Students in remedial courses can often end up performing "better than college-prepared students in terms of their grade point average, retention, and program completion". Remedial students who attend community college orientations and receive more contact with tutoring, advising and mentoring services find these options to be rewarding. Those who complete remedial courses before college level courses often experience more benefits, including higher grade point averages, compared to their counterparts who do not take these remedial courses early in their college careers.

== Disadvantages of community colleges ==
- It is frequent for many courses to be taught by part-time lecturers, adjuncts, or contingent workers, some with only a bachelor's degree in the field. Research conducted by the University of Washington's Labor Center suggests that community colleges' reliance on part-time (adjunct) faculty results in lower graduation rates than colleges with a full-time workforce.
- According to federal statistics, 42% of public community college freshmen take remedial courses, and further studies show that 79% of remedial courses are taught by part-time faculty.
- Individuals with associate degrees usually earn less than those with bachelor's degrees.
- While community colleges are open enrollment institutions, meaning they typically accept and enroll all prospective students as long as fees are paid and the student enrolls in classes (with exceptions where some specific programs are commonly competitive-entry, such as nursing), this open door policy is often seen as a revolving door, with many students, nearly 2/3, not completing their education.
- Some students are placed into remedial courses, even when they only have minor issues, leading them to need to pass and complete remedial courses before being able to enroll in a basic course for that subject area. Likewise, some students are restricted from taking classes in other disciplines, such as physical sciences, until they complete developmental sequences. Students who take remedial courses may not have these count as college credits, and these students may be more likely to complete fewer college credits overall, or even drop out of college entirely. Many community college instructors of remedial courses are part-time faculty members, which can prove challenging to students who require more assistance and contact. While some scholars debate whether money should be allocated toward remedial education, opponents argue that withholding these opportunities also has a direct impact on the quality of employees in the workforce if they continue to lack essential skills.
- Josh M. Beach, author of Gateway to Opportunity?: A History of the Community College in the United States, wrote: "Given that community colleges have never been adequately funded, the so-called 'higher education' that these institutions give students, especially the most academically needy, is often nothing more than a second chance at a high school. ... Rather than free community college, our nation needs to divert more resources to underserved high schools in impoverished neighborhoods, while giving four-year state colleges and universities the proper resources to fully educate all students equally."
- It is often not as easy to make lifelong connections at community colleges compared to universities/four-year colleges because community colleges are largely commuter schools and tend to focus more on academics and career readiness, and not have as many clubs or after-school activities as universities have.
- There is a cultural stigma in the historic connotation that community colleges and for-profit colleges are considered schools of last resort, because of their open-admissions policies, which may reflect poorly upon students who were unable to receive admission to a college offering a wider variety of degree programs. Their open-admissions policies have been the subject of sarcastic humor in popular media.

== Comprehensive community colleges ==
Many schools have adapted the term comprehensive to describe their institutions. These schools typically offer six facets of education:

1. Transfer education – The traditional two-year student who will then transfer to a four-year institution to pursue a BS/BA degree.
2. Career education – The traditional two-year student that will graduate with an associate degree and directly enter the workforce.
3. Developmental – Remedial education for high school graduates who are not academically ready to enroll in college-level courses.
4. Continuing – Non-Credit courses offered to the community for personal development and interest.
5. Industry training – Contracted training and education wherein a local company pays the college to provide specific training or courses for their employees.
6. eLearning – Distance learning occurs online using one's computer and proctored exams. Pell grants and federal aid apply to eLearning also. For example, studying Spanish in an eLearning environment is possible when a student is in another state and federal aid is applied to out-of-state tuition.

Within the transfer education category, comprehensive schools typically have articulation agreements in place that provide prearranged acceptance into specific four-year institutions. At some community colleges, the partnering four-year institution teaches the third and fourth year courses at the community college location and thereby allows a student to obtain a four-year degree without having to physically move to the four-year school.

There are institutions and organizations which provide community college research to inform practice and policy.

For background on U.S. community college libraries, see "Disposed to Consolidation and Innovation: Criteria for the Community College Specialization".

== Comparison with four-year institutions ==
Community colleges serve as both degree granting institutions and transfer pathways to four year colleges and universities. Understanding the comparative costs, outcomes, and challenges between these pathways is essential for prospective students making educational decisions.

=== Cost and access ===
Community colleges offer significantly lower tuition rates compared to four year institutions. For the 2024-25 academic year, average annual tuition and fees at public community colleges were $4,050 for in district students, compared to $10,560 at public four year institutions representing approximately 35% of four-year costs. When including total cost of attendance encompassing tuition, fees, room, board, books, and supplies—community college students pay an average of $20,570 annually, compared to $27,146 for in-state students at public four-year institutions. Students who complete two years at a community college before transferring can save between $20,000 and $40,000 compared to attending a four year institution for all four years, depending on the state and specific institutions involved.

=== Transfer outcomes ===
While approximately 80% of community college students intend to earn a bachelor's degree, only 31.6% transfer to four year institutions within six years. Of those who transfer, 49.7% complete a bachelor's degree, resulting in an overall bachelor's degree attainment rate of just 16% for students who began at community colleges. Transfer success varies significantly by demographics: Black students achieve a 9% bachelor's completion rate, Hispanic students 13%, and low-income students 11%. Students who complete an associate degree before transferring are 60% more likely to earn a bachelor's degree. Transfer success also varies by receiving institution type: 57% of students who transferred to public four year institutions earned bachelor's degrees, compared to 44% at private nonprofit universities and only 25% at for profit or predominantly online institutions.

=== Employment and earnings ===
Educational attainment significantly impacts earnings. The median annual earnings for full time workers aged 25-34 with bachelor's degrees were $66,600 in 2022, compared to $49,500 for those with associate degrees—a 35% earnings premium. Lifetime earnings projections show men with bachelor's degrees earn a median of $2.5 million compared to $1.7 million for those with associate degrees, while women with bachelor's degrees earn $1.5 million compared to $1.1 million for associate degree holders.

== Remediation ==
Remediation, sometimes referred to as developmental education, is a format of education aimed to help open doors for students by reinforcing or re-teaching them core skills. This educational strategy is utilized so students can meet competencies in various academic arenas and further progress in their academics. Remediation is prominent in community colleges, a type of two-year college, as these institutions are designed to accommodate students of various levels of academic abilities. Community college students are placed into remedial coursework according to their performance on placement-based testing they take prior to beginning classes.

=== Assignment ===
The push in shifting students to enroll in remedial courses at community colleges stems from philosophical beliefs and reputations that these are the most appropriate places for instruction. All community colleges have developmental or remedial courses of some kind. Around 42 percent of first-year students attending two-year colleges in the United States sign up for remedial courses, twice as many as those at four-year universities or colleges. In Ohio, four in ten traditional-age students at community colleges enroll in remedial English courses, whereas six in ten enroll in remedial math. This state example reflects national studies that show a higher need for remedial community college students to take math courses, which also often have bigger class sizes and more levels of coursework than their remedial reading and writing counterpart courses. Students start taking remedial coursework in community colleges according to their performance on college placement tests, considered by some scholars to be far from perfect in their designs. Community colleges possess few admission requirements, meaning these types of institutions see a higher number of remedial students. Remedial education within community colleges may exist within an academic department, in its own academic department, or in an entire academic unit of its own.

=== Successful approaches ===
Scholars recommend that community colleges can enhance their remedial education programs through utilizing a variety of methods. Community colleges are suggested to allow students to have the option of taking other courses, in addition to remedial courses, so they may feel like they are making progress with their programs. The institution of learning communities at community colleges may be challenging due to the nature of these students coming to and leaving campus often, but they have been helpful for remedial students at other postsecondary educations in facilitating friendships, improved studying patterns, and higher rates of passing courses. Technology-enhanced classrooms, complete with SmartBoards, computers and online networks, can increase the level of motivation that remedial community college students place toward their academic work. Remedial students obtaining academic assistance via college writing centers can also be helpful for enhancing their skills, as well as observing the interdisciplinary nature of classroom concepts and learning strategies.

=== Gainful employment ===
Gainful employment is a concept that ties college attainment with improved job opportunities. In 2010, the Obama Administration began enacting gainful employment policies that required career colleges and some community college programs to maintain transparency and accountability about their effectiveness, and tied federal Title IV funding with gainful employment performance. Under Department of Education Betsy DeVos, these policies were unraveled.

== State community college systems ==
Community colleges and vocational schools in the United States

- Alabama Community College System
- California Community Colleges
- Colorado Community College System
- Connecticut State Community College
- Delaware Technical Community College
- Florida College System
- Technical College System of Georgia
- Illinois Community College System
- Ivy Tech Community College of Indiana
- Kansas Community College Association
- Kentucky Community and Technical College System
- Louisiana Community and Technical College System
- Maine Community College System
- Massachusetts Association of Community Colleges
- Minnesota State Colleges and Universities System
- Mississippi Community College Board
- Nevada System of Higher Education
- Community College System of New Hampshire
- New Mexico Association of Community Colleges
- New York SUNY - CUNY
- North Carolina Community College System
- North Dakota Community Colleges
- Ohio Association of Community Colleges
- Community College of Rhode Island
- South Carolina Technical College System
- Tennessee Board of Regents
- Utah System of Higher Education
- Community College of Vermont
- Virginia Community College System
- Washington State Board for Community and Technical Colleges
- West Virginia Community and Technical College System
- Wisconsin Technical College System
- Wyoming Community College Commission

== See also ==
- List of educational software
- Lists of occupations and List of construction trades
- List of community colleges in the United States
- List of engineering schools in the United States
- Lists of American universities and colleges
- Career and technical education
- College admissions in the United States
- Community College Research Center
- Transfer admissions in the United States
- American Graduation Initiative
- Higher education in the United States
- American Association of Community Colleges
