= Let's Go (textbooks) =

English-language education textbooks

Let's Go is a series of American-English based EFL (English as a foreign language) textbooks developed by Oxford University Press and first released in 1990. While having its origins in ESL teaching in the US, and then as an early EFL resource in Japan, the series is currently in general use for English-language learners in over 160 countries around the world. The series is now in its 5th edition, which was released in 2019, although the 3rd series is still in print.

== Development ==
The series was written by two (at that time) US-based EFL/ESL teachers and two Asia-based teachers. Ritsuko Nakata gained a BA from the University of California in Los Angeles, and has been involved in ELT for over 30 years, and is currently President of IIEEC, Teacher Training Center for English Teachers of Children, and President of AETC, The Association of English Teachers, based in Japan. Karen Frazier Tsai (cited as Karen Frazier) has 20 years experience of teaching ESL and has worked and travelled throughout Asia, Europe, and North America. Barbara Hoskins Sakamoto (cited as Barbara Hoskins) gained her MA in Teaching English as a Second Language from Northern Arizona University, and had been based in Japan since 1985. Carolyn Graham is the creator of Jazz Chants, which connect the rhythm of spoken American English to the beat of jazz.

According to Nakata:

In 1989, I was approached by the senior editor of Oxford University Press in New York asking me about what the Japanese market needed in terms of a new textbook. At the time, the only texts available were ESL texts that were written for students learning English in English speaking countries, so they were not appropriate for our Japanese students who were coming to class just once a week.

According to Hoskins:

Let’s Go has been a remarkably collaborative piece of publishing. It was one of Oxford’s first publishing projects which worked with authors living in different countries. When we first started, I lived in California, Karen Frazier (Tsai) lived in Taipei, Ritsuko Nakata was in Tokyo, and Carolyn Graham was in New York. Back then, we felt quite high tech with our desk top computers and fax machines–there was no internet or email yet!

== Titles ==
The series is targeted towards an age range of 5–13 years of age (levels beginner to pre-intermediate). The 1st series (Books 1-6) was published in 1990, the 2nd in 1998, the 3rd in 2006, and the 4th in 2011. The lower level Let's Go Starter (by Nakata, Hoskins, and Frazier) was first released in 1997, before being replaced by Let's Begin in later series. Ancillary publications include workbooks for each of the levels, Let's Go Phonics (by Jeffrrey Lehman), Let's Chant, Let's Sing (by Graham), and Let's Go Picture Dictionary (by Nakata, Frazier, and Hoskins). Available resources include teacher books, classroom CDs, teacher vocabulary cards and student vocabulary cards.

== Methodology ==
The series claims to improve student learning and classroom pedagogy in the following ways:

- Conversations and question-and-answer practice get children talking from the very beginning.
- Interactive songs and chants by Carolyn Graham bring classrooms to life.
- Supported by Let's Chant, Let's Sing: Greatest Hits CD with additional worksheets.
- Phonics and reading lessons help children to read fluently. Fun phonics chants and drum tracks improve pronunciation and intonation.
- Communication games give children many more opportunities to use English with confidence.
- Test Center CD-ROM includes placement tests, Cambridge YLE practice tests, and print-ready and editable unit, mid-term, and final tests.
- Bring language learning alive with Online Practice, an interactive homework system that you can assign and track.
