= Caroline Graham =

Caroline Graham may refer to:

- Caroline Graham, Duchess of Montrose (1770–1847), British duchess
- Caroline Graham (writer) (b. 1931), English writer
- Caroline Graham Hansen (b. 1995), Norwegian footballer

== See also ==
- Carolyn Graham, American educational writer
