= Express Publishing =

Educational publisher

- Founded: 1988
- Headquarters location: Berkshire, UK
- Publication types: ELT, EFL, ELL, ESP
- Official website: expresspublishing.co.uk

Express Publishing is an independent UK-based publishing house headquartered in Berkshire, United Kingdom. Founded in 1988, the company specializes in English language learning and teaching (ELT) and educational materials for English language learners and teachers worldwide. Express Publishing operates in more than 100 countries, with many of its publications and educational resources receiving official ministerial approvals.

The company publishes a wide range of educational materials, including coursebooks, graded readers, examination preparation resources, grammar and vocabulary books, English for Specific Purposes (ESP) titles, and digital learning platforms. In recent years, Express Publishing has expanded its digital ecosystem through platforms and applications such as DigiBooks, DigiIWB, and augmented reality (AR) learning tools.

== History and Milestones ==
1988

Express Publishing creates and prints its first publication, Functional Grammar.

1996

The company publishes its first coursebook, Mission, and begins exporting educational materials to Poland, marking its first international expansion.

2007

Development of the company’s first Interactive Whiteboard software for Upstream is completed.

2008

Educational resources published by Express Publishing receive official approval from the Bulgarian Ministry of Education.

2011

The company releases its first iBook, expanding into interactive digital language learning.

2015

Launch of Express DigiBooks, a learning management platform designed to support homework integration and blended learning.

2017

The DigiBooks application is updated with more gamified and interactive features.

2023

Launch of DigiIWB, an upgraded and more responsive Interactive Whiteboard platform. The cross-device application is designed to enhance classroom interaction and streamline navigation across components.

== Educational Solutions ==
Express Publishing develops educational content designed to support effective communication, life skills, and language development.

Coursebooks

The company’s coursebooks incorporate cross-cultural and cross-curricular elements while focusing on the development of integrated language skills.

Readers

Its readers complement all courses and encourage learners to explore English through classic, original, and non-fiction stories.

Digital Learning Tools

Digital resources developed by Express Publishing enrich learning through interactive features and gamification elements. The company’s platforms and applications support self-directed learning and targeted language development.

Digital solutions include:

- DigiBooks, a digital learning management platform

- DigiIWB, an interactive whiteboard application for classroom instruction

- AR (Augmented Reality) applications, designed to extend learning through immersive interactive experiences

English for Specific Purposes (ESP)

The company publishes English for Specific Purposes (ESP) materials designed for professionals, vocational school students, and college learners preparing for workplace communication.

== Key partnerships ==
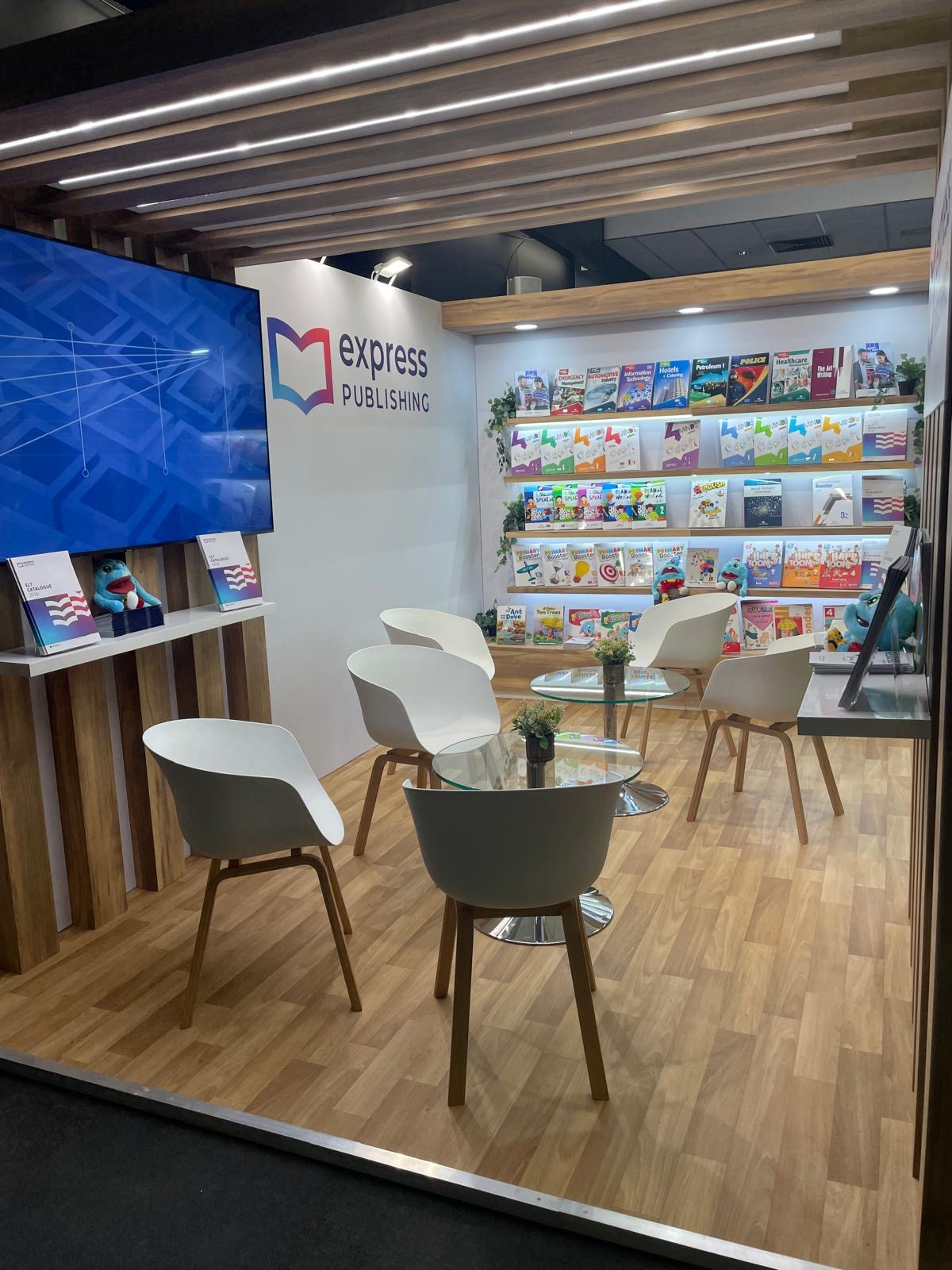
International Event 2026

- Prosveshcheniye Publishers, Russia
- Aksorn Charoen Tat ACT Co. Ltd., Thailand
- Ingram Content Group, United States
- TrackTest

== Products ==
Express Publishing has produced a wide variety of over 3,500 titles of teaching materials, including course books, grammar books, exam material, skills books, English for Specific Purposes books, readers, CD-ROMs, DVD-ROMs, offline interactive whiteboard software, an interactive e-book, and cross-platform application programs.

The interactive whiteboard software caters to instructors' needs for in-class teaching and the interactive e-book product students' learning process for after class practice and activities.

In September 2014, Express Publishing introduced Zachary & the Bitterlings and Zachary & the Frostlings, two interactive video games that are designed for students of all ages. The purpose of these two interactive video games is to motivate and assist pupils in developing essential skills while learning English in a game-play environment.

== Recent Releases ==
Recent educational series and releases by Express Publishing include:

- HappyToons

- Hashtag English

- 4Minds

These titles combine language learning with interactive, learner-centered approaches and digital integration.

== Awards and nominations ==
=== Awards ===
Express Publishing won the Digita Award 2005 in Germany for the Story of Santa Claus.

=== Nominations ===
British Council has nominated Express Publishing multiple times for the Elton awards:

- Blockbuster Series (2007) nominated for Product Innovation and Effective Digital Learning.
- Fairyland series (2008) nominated for Product Innovation and Effective Digital Learning.
- Spark series (2011) nominated for Product Innovation and Effective Digital Learning.
- Career Paths Beauty Salon (2012) an English for specific purposes book, nominated for Excellence in Course Innovation
- Happy Rhymes (2013) nominated for Digital Innovation.
- Discover our Amazing World - CLIL Readers (2014) nominated for Innovation in Learner Resources.
- Pathways to Literature (2015) nominated for Excellence in Course Innovation.

== Global Presence ==
Express Publishing distributes educational materials internationally and maintains a presence in more than 100 countries. Many of its publications and educational resources have received approvals from ministries of education and educational institutions worldwide.
