= Test track =

Test track may refer to:

- Test Track, a slot car attraction in World Discovery at Walt Disney World's Epcot in Bay Lake, Florida
- Lego Technic Test Track, a rollercoaster
- TestTrack, computer software for managing requirements, defects, issues and testing activity
- Railway test track
- SpaceX Hypertube test track

== See also ==
- Proving ground
- TrackTest
