= College Promise =

American education campaign

College Promise is a national non-partisan campaign that supports funding the first two years of higher education, starting with community colleges in the United States. While state-level campaigns often lack funding, College Promise highlights growing concerns about unaffordable college costs and student loan debt in the United States. College Promise is an initiative of Civic Nation, a 501(c)(3) non-profit organization founded in 2015.

== History ==
Higher education in the United States has been restrictive for most of US history, serving elites at first, and slowly growing more egalitarian from the 1800s to the early 2000s. Government action such as the Morrill Act, GI Bill and Civil Rights Act increased accessibility while growing student populations. In the 1960s, community colleges were low cost, and some larger universities were also low cost. For many reasons, college affordability has been a significant issue in US higher education, especially since 1970.

In 2005, the Kalamazoo Promise program was instituted so that local high school students could attend Michigan colleges with a 65 percent to 100 percent tuition discount. In 2014, Tennessee was the first state to initiate a program for free tuition at community colleges. In his 2015 State of the Union Address, President Barack Obama proposed making community college tuition free to many residents of the US. Despite its popularity, the plan did not materialize. In September 2015, the College Promise Campaign was started, which serves to educate and promote College Promise programs in the United States. At that time, there were 53 College Promise Programs in place. By 2017, 16 states had at least one statewide College Promise program. A year later, the College Promise movement grew to over 300 programs in 24 states. As of September 2019, it was observed that there are over 320 College Promise Programs in 47 states nationwide.

== Leadership ==
The College Promise advisory board consists of 37 leaders representing interests from education, business, philanthropy, labor, nonprofits, government, and students.

== Funding ==
College Promise's donors include the Kresge Foundation, Carnegie Corporation of New York, J.P. Morgan, Great Lakes, Arconic Foundation, and the Joyce Foundation.

== Research about College Promise programs ==
How each College Promise program works influences its effectiveness.

According to the Institute for Women’s Policy Research (IWPR), College Promise programs that only cover tuition costs may be insufficient for working-class people who may need help with housing, childcare, food and transportation costs. Other researchers have reported similar limitations.

=== Pacific NW Study ===
One of the early Promise Programs began in 2007 in the Pacific Northwest; graduating students from one high school were able to attend their first year of a local community college due to scholarships with both government and private funding. The selected high school was located in a large city in a low-income neighborhood, and more than half of the students were minorities. From the period between 2005 and 2007 before the Promise Program was announced, only 6.2% of graduating seniors enrolled in college, but following the implementation of the Promise program in 2008, 60.7% of graduating seniors enrolled to college. The fall-to winter retention rates of first-year students who attended college because of the Promise Program was 90%, indicating that the initiative increased student enrollment in college and academic success. Despite the high retention rates observed in this study, few students were placed into college-level math and English classes, and the average college grade point average (GPA) during their freshman year was 1.83, suggesting that students were not prepared in high school for the rigor of college classes. A total of 51 students participated in the study, with 46 students reenrolling for a second semester. Nonetheless, this Promise Program increased college attendance for lower-income students more than other Promise Programs, such as the Oregon Promise, because it does not take into account family income.

=== Oregon Study ===
A state-wide Promise Program was started in Oregon in 2016, where community college tuition is covered to residents of Oregon with a cumulative high school GPA of 2.5 or higher. The Oregon Promise is a “last-dollar” scholarship, meaning that aid will only be rewarded after all other federal loans are applied, such as the Pell Grant. In 2016–2017, students from middle-income families received 53% of all aid rewarded from the Oregon Promise because they did not meet the requirements for the Pell Grant, while lower-income families received 47% of tuition covered because slightly higher percentages of these students qualified for more federal and state grants. Overall, 6,745 students who attended Oregon Community Colleges received the scholarship out of 10,500 applicants who met the scholarship requirements. Despite the problems in allocating scholarships primarily to need-based students, it was observed that Oregon community colleges saw an increase of 4%-5% in student enrollment in 2017.

Last Dollar vs First Dollar Promise Programs

Most Promise Programs in the United States currently award scholarships on a "last dollar" approach, meaning that students who qualify for need-based grants will only receive their scholarships after federal and state grants are exhausted. Creating programs based on "last dollar" financial aid is cheaper to states and cities than the alternate "first dollar" scholarships. In last dollar programs, low-income students should be receiving less aid from Promise scholarships than middle-income and high-income students. However, this is not necessarily true. Lower-income students will receive their Promise Program scholarship as well as federal grants, but middle-class students may only receive the Promise Program scholarship. Many middle-class families make too much money for students to qualify for federal grants such as the Pell Grant, but they do not make enough to comfortably send their children to public universities even with financial aid. Often middle-class families are not able to afford college tuition prices and do not receive additional aid, and these students end up graduating college with thousands of dollars in student loan debt. Shifting scholarship aid from last dollar to first dollar can greatly benefit both low-income and middle-class students, but that would require the assistance of the federal government.

=== Kalamazoo Study ===
A well-known example is seen in Kalamazoo, Michigan, where Kalamazoo Public School (KPS) students have 100% of their tuition covered by anonymous donors in Michigan universities if they attended KPS from kindergarten through 12th grade. When Kalamazoo announced their Promise Program in 2005, KPS schools saw a surge in student enrollment, while other districts across the state and nation saw a decline in student enrollment. In 2009, it was observed that enrollment in KPS increased by 2,400 students. Not only were there more students enrolling, but schools also observed less high school seniors students drop-out. The effects of the Promise Program made many positive advancements in Kalamazoo, especially since many of the students in KPS came from poorer communities. Many more students have the opportunity to attend college, when they otherwise would not have had the chance. The Kalamazoo Promise is still in effect as of 2020, and will be continuing indefinitely.

=== Problems Associated with Expanding Promise Programs ===
Although there are many reasons why free higher education is beneficial to society, there are also problems that will arise if Promise Programs are instituted nationwide. President Lyndon B. Johnson implemented federal student loan and grant programs in 1965, which were supposed to help lower income students attend college. With the mass adoption of federal funding, universities became much cheaper and easier to access. This means free tuition hangs on taxes. During the Reagan '80s, Tax and Expenditure Limitations were passed. Colleges could no longer afford free tuition due to a massive cut to state spending, which consequently drastically increased the cost of tuition and other fees. Furthermore, if public universities become free to all students, more students will have access to higher education and will be expected to retain a degree, regardless of whether they actually need one.

== See also ==
- Higher education in the United States
- Community colleges in the United States
- Student loan debt in the United States
- Kalamazoo Promise
