= Oxford Placement Test =

English language proficiency test

- Acronym: OPT, OOPT
- Type: Standardized test
- Administrator: Oxford University Press
- Skills tested: Use of English and Writing of the English language
- Purpose: To establish the English CEFR level of non-native English speakers
- Year started: 2009; 16 years ago
- Duration: Approx. 60 minutes.
- Score range: 0 to 120.
- Score validity: Scores are valid for life
- Offered: Provided globally by schools, universities and employers
- Regions: Available globally
- Languages: English
- Prerequisites: No official prerequisite. Intended for non-native English speakers.
- Fee: Check with local approved test centre
- Website: elt.oup.com/feature/global/oxford-online-placement/?cc=gb&selLanguage=enn

The Oxford Placement Test (OPT), also called the Oxford Online Placement Test (OOPT), is an on demand computer-adaptive test of the English language for non-native speakers of English, reporting at Pre-A1, A1, A2, B1, B2, C1, and C2 levels of the Common European Framework of Reference (CEFR). The test was developed by Oxford University Press (OUP) to provide institutions with a quick, reliable way to place English language students into the correct level English class. Placement testing is a key stage in the learning cycle.

== History ==
The Oxford Placement Test, the first globally available online computer-adaptive placement test, was launched in 2009 and has placed millions of test takers since it was launched. It tests British English, American English, or a mix of the two language variants. The OPT replaced the now retired Quick Placement Test, a CD-ROM test provided in partnership with Cambridge English. The success of the Oxford Placement Test led to the design of the Oxford Test of English, and online computer-adaptive English Proficiency test, used as proof of English ability for university entry and employment.

== Test specifications ==
The Oxford Placement Test is designed to provide a quick, accurate measurement of a test taker's English language ability on the CEFR scale. The test consists of two sections: Language Use and Listening. Within the Use of English Section, in addition to standard grammar, lexis and listening questions, the test design focuses on meaning beyond the sentence, including implied meaning; the language sampled in the test is an accurate predictor of general language ability. The test has been independently reviewed and found perform better than other placement tests.

Section	Part	Test focus
Use of English	1	Grammatical form and meaning
Use of English	2	Implied meaning
Use of English	3	Reading
Listening	1	Five short dialogues
Listening	2	Five longer dialogues
Listening	3	Five short monologues

=== Computer adaptive ===
The Oxford Placement Test uses computer-adaptive testing (CAT) technology. Computer adaptive tests can be more efficient and provide more precise measurement than traditional tests. The adaptive test works by selecting each successive question from a large bank of questions, based on the test taker's response to the previous question. This makes for a better test experience for test takers than traditional language tests.

The OPT's online Learning Management System (LMS) allows institutions to administer the test at physical institutions, or for the test to be taken at the test taker's home.

== Results ==
Results are available immediately and are reported as a CEFR band (Pre-A1 to C2) and as a standardized score (0-120) on the OPT scale. Report cards provide a breakdown by section, including the time taken to complete each section. Report cards can carry the institution's branding. The CEFR levels and standardized scores are shown in this table:

CEFR	Standardized score
C2.2	111-120
C2.1	101-110
C1.2	91-100
C1.1	81-90
B2.2	71-80
B2.1	61-70
B1.2	51-60
B1.1	41-50
A2.2	31-40
A2.1	21-30
A1.2	11-20
A1.1	1-10
Pre-A1 (High)	0.7-0.9
Pre-A1 (Mid)	0.4-0.6
Pre-A1 (Low)	0.1-0.3
