= Jazz Chants =

Language teaching exercise

Jazz Chants are exercises in which students utter words and short phrases rhythmically. They were first popularized by Carolyn Graham in the 1980s.

== Concept ==
Jazz Chant is a rhythmic expression of natural language which links the rhythms of spoken American English to the rhythms of traditional American jazz. Jazz Chants are defined poems with repeated beats. The beat may vary depending on the idea of the reader. A jazz chant is a fragment of authentic language presented with special attention to its natural rhythm. It is important to remember that jazz chanting is not like rapping, nursery rhymes, or songs, which distort the spoken language for poetic effect. The rhythms, stress and intonation pattern of the chant should be an exact replica of what the student would hear from an educated native speaker in natural conversation. Echols (1996:327) states that chant means simple and short songs. So Jazz Chants is the technique to practice the English utterances in short jazz beats that is easy to be followed by the students. As we know that the teaching and learning process is a complex phenomenon that involves many components and competencies, including words, mind, and our action. Through attractive learning, the learning process can be effective. The jazz chants model is a way to build an effective learning. The implementation of jazz chants is suitable with the principle of quantum teaching in classrooms that drives students in a happy atmosphere while learning.

Implementation of Chant Jazz model, this is included in the effort of practicing Quantum Teaching in Class. Quantum Teaching is a fun learning composition with all the interactions and differences that maximize learning moments. The focus is on dynamic relationships within the classroom environment, the interaction that provides the foundation and framework for learning (De Porter, 2003).

Implementation

1. Students are grouped into two groups

2. At the preparatory stage the teacher records the responses of English utterances that cannot be uttered by the students.

3. As a tool, teachers use tape recorders to play jazz chant examples.

4. In this period, the teacher emphasizes the primary tense and simple present tense.

To improve students 'speaking ability in reading aloud (students' reading is recorded one = aloud) especially vocal sounds (a, e and u). Broadly speaking students are given a drill of some chant models with certain dominant sounds. After practice chant, tested the ability of students in uttering certain voiced words by reading a simple sentence loud. For the accuracy of the data, students' voices are recorded one by one. The assessment is done simply by counting the correct number and wrong of each student

Carolyn Graham developed the technique of jazz chanting during her twenty-five years of teaching ESL in the American Language Institute of New York University. Throughout the '80s and '90s Graham's jazz chants spread far and wide along with the ESL teaching methods and techniques. Graham published a number of books, tape recordings and CDs on her method mainly by Oxford University Press. The series of computer programs Languages with Music is the first software based on Jazz Chants ideas.

Jazz Chants appeal to students of all ages, and work with large classes, and stimulate pairwork and role-playing activities. Jazz chants improve the students' speaking competence in terms of pronunciation, grammar, vocabulary, fluency and comprehension. Jazz chants help students sound more natural when they speak English. Today jazz chants can be heard in ESL and EFL classrooms around the world.
