= Carolyn Graham =

American textbook writer

- Occupations: Musician, writer, teacher, teacher trainer
- Writing career
- Language: English
- Genres: Text book, poetry, Songs

Carolyn Graham is the creator of numerous English-language teaching books, most notably Jazz Chants and Let's Sing, Let's Chant, published by Oxford University Press. She also wrote the songs for the Let's Go (textbooks) and Susan Rivers' Tiny Talk series of ELT books, also published by OUP.

== Jazz Chants ==
Throughout the 1980s and 1990s Graham's Jazz Chants became popular along with the ESL teaching methods and techniques during the same period. Graham developed the technique of jazz chanting during her 25 years of teaching ESL in the American Language Institute of New York University. She has also taught at Harvard University and has conducted workshops in the NYU School of Education, Columbia Teachers College in New York and Tokyo, and elsewhere throughout the world.

== Bibliography ==
Graham is the author of numerous Jazz Chants books, mostly published by Oxford University Press.

- Carolyn Graham (April 1978). Jazz Chants(r): Student Book. USA: Oxford University Press. ISBN 0195024079.
- Carolyn Graham (March 1979). Jazz Chants for Children. USA: Oxford University Press. ISBN 0195024966.
- Carolyn Graham (March 1982). The Carolyn Graham Turn-Of-The-Century Songbook: The Sounds and Structures of English Set to the Music of Favorite American Songs. USA: Prentice Hall. ISBN 0883454882.
- Carolyn Graham (July 1986). Small Talk More Jazz Chants. USA: Oxford University Press. ISBN 0194342204.
- Carolyn Graham (February 1992). Small Talk: More Jazz Chants, Exercises. USA: Delta Systems. ISBN 0194346382.
- Carolyn Graham (March 1992). The Chocolate Cake: Songs and Poems for Children. USA: Delta Systems. ISBN 0155996959.
- Carolyn Graham (September 1992). Let's Go 1: Teacher Cards. USA: Oxford University Press. ISBN 0194344908.
- Carolyn Graham; Marilyn S. Rosenthal (April 1993). Grammarchants: Student Book (Jazz Chants). USA: Oxford University Press. ISBN 0194342360.
- Carolyn Graham (January 1995). The Story of the Fisherman and the Turtle Princess. USA: Harcourt Brace and Company. ISBN 0155996932.
- Carolyn Graham (January 1995). Let's Chant, Let's Sing Sb 2: Sb 2. USA: Oxford University Press. ISBN 0194346528.
- Bill Bliss; Steven J. Molinsky; Carolyn Graham; Carol H. Van Duzer; Deborah L. Schaffer (January 1995). Navigator. Vol. 1. USA: Pearson ESL. ISBN 0133595633.
- Carolyn Graham (November 1996). Let's Chant, Let's Sing Sb 4: Sb 4. USA: Oxford University Press. ISBN 0194348946.
- Carolyn Graham; Susan Rivers (October 1997). Tiny Talk 2a Student Book. United Kingdom: Oxford University Press. ISBN 0194351602.
- Carolyn Graham (February 1997). Expressways 3 Activity Workbook. USA: Pearson Education. ISBN 0135708966.
- Carolyn Graham (March 1998). Let's Chant, Let's Sing 1-2 Sample Pages - Gratis. USA: Oxford University Press. ISBN 0194700623.
- Carolyn Graham (September 1999). Holiday Jazz Chants: Student Book. USA: Oxford University Press. ISBN 0194349276.
- Carolyn Graham; Susan Rivers (June 1999). Tiny Talk Songbook. Oxford University Press. ISBN 0194353583.
- Carolyn Graham (October 1999). Holiday Jazz Chants: Cassette. United Kingdom: Oxford University Press. ISBN 0194349284.
- Carolyn Graham (1999). The Fisherman and the Turtle Princess-Songs and Chant Book: A Classic Folktale Chant. USA: Houghton Mifflin Harcourt. ISBN 0155996908.
- Carolyn Graham (December 2000). Jazz Chants Old and New. USA: Oxford University Press. ISBN 0194366987.
- Carolyn Graham (March 2000). Travel Smart: Nevada. USA: Avalon Travel Publishing. ISBN 1562614347.
- Steven J. Molinsky; Bill Bliss; Carolyn Graham; Peter S. Bliss (February 2001). Side By Side: Activity Workbook 1. USA: Pearson Education. ISBN 0130267457.
- Steven J. Molinsky; Bill Bliss; Carolyn Graham; Peter S. Bliss (February 2001). Side By Side: Activity Workbook 2. USA: Pearson Education. ISBN 0130267503.
- Steven J. Molinsky; Bill Bliss; Carolyn Graham; Peter S. Bliss (November 2001). Side By Side: Activity Workbook 3. USA: Pearson Education. ISBN 0130268755.
- Steven J. Molinsky; Carolyn Graham (November 2002). Zabadoo! Level 3. USA: Oxford University Press. ISBN 0194383679.
- Carolyn Graham (March 2003). The Oxford Picture Dictionary for the Content Areas: Worksheets. USA: Oxford University Press. ISBN 0194343421.
- Carolyn Graham (May 2003). Grammarchants: More Jazz Chants. USA: Oxford University Press. ISBN 0194343421.
- Carolyn Graham (November 2003). Word & Picture Cards. USA: Oxford University Press. ISBN 0194345807.
- Helen Kalkstein Fragiadakis; Carolyn Graham (April 2004). Grammar Step by Step - Book 1 (Beginning) - Student Book. USA: McGraw-Hill. ISBN 0072845201.
- Carolyn Graham (April 2006). Creating Songs & Chants. United Kingdom: Oxford University Press. ISBN 0194422364.
- Carolyn Graham (September 2007). Longman Young Children's Picture Dictionary. USA: Prentice Hall. ISBN 978-9620054105.
