= Aksorn Education =

Educational publisher

- Formerly: Aksorn Charoen Tat
- Company type: Public limited company
- Founded: 1935; 91 years ago

Aksorn Education Plc is a Thai educational publishing company. It was formerly named Aksorn Charoen Tat. The company was founded in 1935. It is a major publisher of textbooks in Thailand.

== History ==
The company was founded in 1935. It originally created palm-leaf manuscripts of sermons for the Wat Suthat temple in Bangkok. It later beginning printing text books for students using a printing press. As of 2007, it was the second largest textbook publisher in Thailand. It is the largest educational company in Thailand as of 2014.

In 2015, the company's name was changed from Aksorn Charoen Tat to Aksorn Education. It began developing educational training, toys, and software like Aksorn Learning Ecosystem, which allows students to read textbooks and other materials using digital devices. As of 2015, roughly 60% of its revenue came from the sale of textbooks for kindergarten through high school. The remaining revenue came from the sale of educational software. The company publishes textbooks under the subsidiary Aksorn Charoen Tat and publishes software under the subsidiary Aksorn Inspire. In 2023, the company invested in Vietnamese startup MindX.

The company has been controlled by the Aksorn family since its founding, and the current CEO is Tawan Dheva-Aksorn.
