= American Graduation Initiative =

The American Graduation Initiative was President Obama's initiative for Community Colleges.

Obama announced the initiative at Macomb Community College in suburban Detroit in the summer of 2009. He proposed investing roughly $12 billion in community colleges over 10 years, with the goal of greatly improving their performance in getting students through to earn degrees and credentials, and increasing the number of community college graduates by 5 million over that time.

In an effort to help ensure passage of the controversial Patient Protection and Affordable Care Act of 2010, Obama reduced funding for the college initiative to $2 billion, for career training, through a program administered by the U.S. Department of Labor.

Ten years after the initiative was announced, the United States was far from reaching the graduation goals announced by Obama.

== Background ==
An article in The Washington Post published on July 15, 2009, disclosed that President Obama will allocate $12 billion for community colleges in the US that would lead to five million new graduates by the year 2020. The American Graduation Initiative will provide training for millions of American students who do not have the financial means to study in universities as well as the opportunity for older workers who require additional skills.

The program helped elevate the prominence and status of community colleges and raised public awareness throughout the country. Through the economic stimulus bill of 2011, President Obama allotted $5 billion for the improvement of these institutions. The former president also obtained $2 billion for the approval and funding of the Trade Adjustment Assistance Community College and Career Training Grant Program. On January 8, 2015, Obama made the proposal for two years of free tuition for community colleges. President Barack Obama's American Graduation Initiative may be considered one of the foundations of the Obama administration in terms of higher education.

Time magazine describes community colleges as “the unique contribution of the United States to higher education globally.” From the late 19th century until the early part of the 20th century, these two-year learning institutions addressed concerns in post-secondary education. This model is based on Germany's educational system, wherein the first two years of college are segregated from the final years which are full of research work. It was a sort of preparation of junior students for heavier load and responsibilities in higher institutions of learning
