= National Student Clearinghouse =

Educational nonprofit in the United States

The National Student Clearinghouse is an educational nonprofit that provides educational reporting, verification, and research services to North American colleges and universities. NSC has a nationwide network of roughly 3,600 colleges, representing 97 percent of postsecondary enrollment. It was incorporated in Herndon, Virginia on July 2, 1993. Its services help schools stay in compliance with the Family Educational Rights and Privacy Act and the Higher Education Act.

The research arm of the Clearinghouse issues numerous publications, including a bi-annual report on US higher education enrollment, mobility, completion, and other student outcomes that are gleaned from Clearinghouse data.
