= Oxford University Press =

Publishing arm of the University of Oxford

- Parent company: University of Oxford
- Founded: 1586; 440 years ago
- Country of origin: United Kingdom
- Headquarters location: Oxford, England
- Key people: Nigel Portwood (Secretary to the Delegates and CEO)
- Publication types: Academic journals; books; sheet music
- Imprints: Clarendon Press; Blackstone Press
- No. of employees: 6,000
- Official website: corp.oup.com global.oup.com/ukhe/

Oxford University Press (OUP) is the publishing house of the University of Oxford. It is the largest university press in the world. Its first book was printed in Oxford in 1478, with the press officially granted the legal right to print books by decree in 1586. It is the second-oldest university press after Cambridge University Press, which was founded in 1534.

It is a department of the University of Oxford. It is governed by a group of 15 academics, the Delegates of the Press, appointed by the vice-chancellor of the University of Oxford. The Delegates of the Press are led by the Secretary to the Delegates, who serves as OUP's chief executive and as its major representative on other university bodies. Oxford University Press has had a similar governance structure since the 17th century. The press is located on Walton Street, Oxford, opposite Somerville College, in the inner suburb of Jericho.

For the last 400 years, OUP has focused primarily on the publication of pedagogical texts. It continues this tradition today by publishing academic journals, dictionaries, English language resources, bibliographies, books on Indology, music, classics, literature, and history, as well as Bibles and atlases. OUP has offices around the world, primarily in locations that were once part of the British Empire.

== History ==
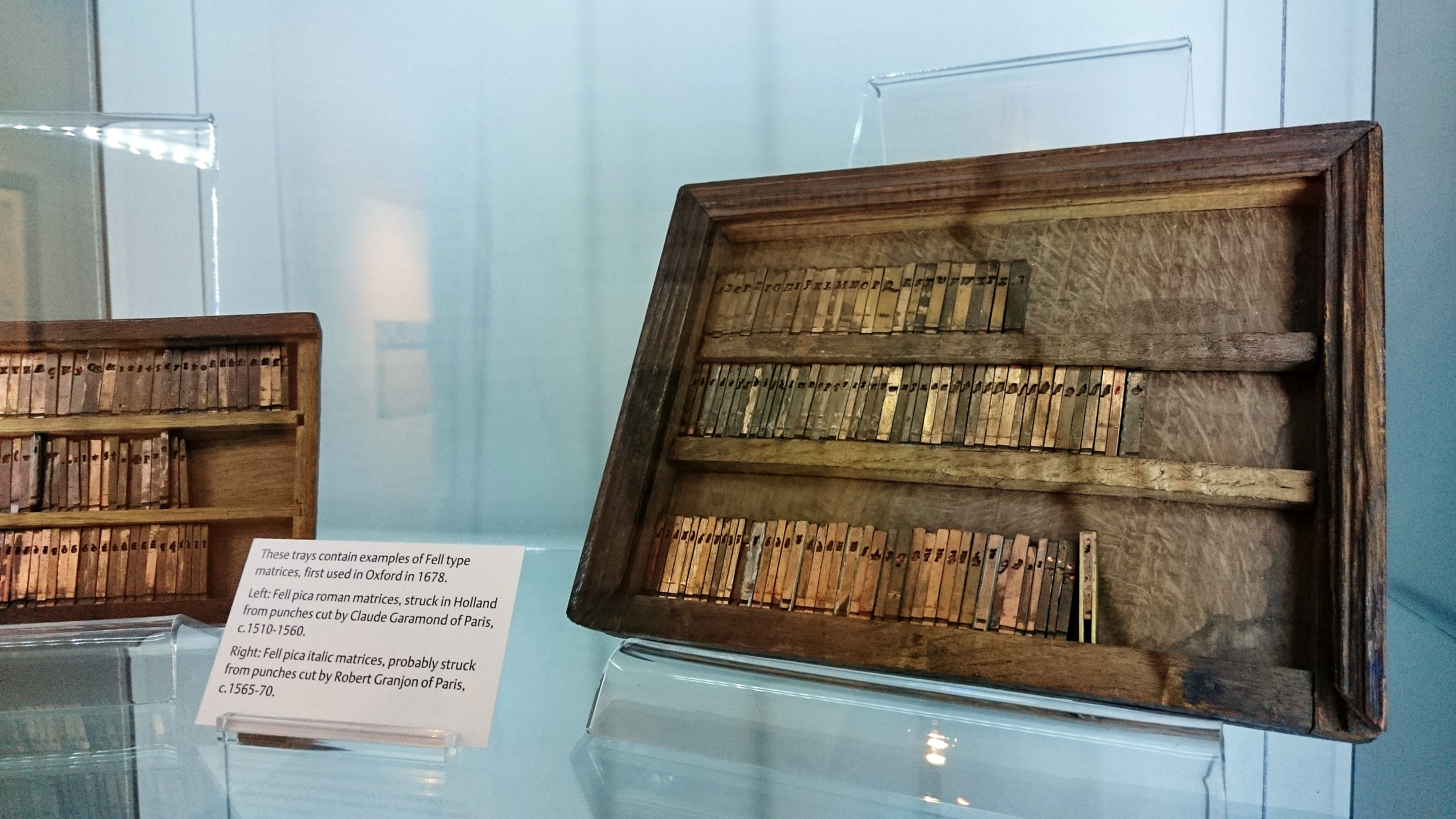
Matrices for casting type collected by Bishop Fell, part of his collection now known as the "Fell Types", shown in the OUP Museum

=== Early origins (1480–1668) ===
The University of Oxford began printing around 1480 and became a major printer of Bibles, prayer books, and scholarly works. Oxford's chancellor Archbishop William Laud consolidated the legal status of the university's printing in the 1630s and petitioned Charles I for rights that would enable Oxford to compete with the Stationers' Company and the King's Printer. He obtained a succession of royal grants, and Oxford's "Great Charter" in 1636 gave the university the right to print "all manner of books". Laud also obtained the "privilege" from the Crown of printing the King James or Authorized Version of Scripture at Oxford. This privilege created substantial returns over the next 250 years.

=== Print shop establishment and expansion (1668–1830) ===
Following the English Civil War, Vice-chancellor John Fell, Dean of Christ Church, Bishop of Oxford, and Secretary to the Delegates was determined to install printing presses in 1668, making it the university's first central print shop. In 1674, OUP began to print a broadsheet calendar, known as the Oxford Almanack, that was produced annually without interruption from 1674 to 2019. Fell drew up the first formal programme for the university's printing, which envisaged hundreds of works, including the Bible in Greek, editions of the Coptic Gospels and works of the Church Fathers, texts in Arabic and Syriac, comprehensive editions of classical philosophy, poetry, and mathematics, a wide range of medieval scholarship, and also "a history of insects, more perfect than any yet Extant."

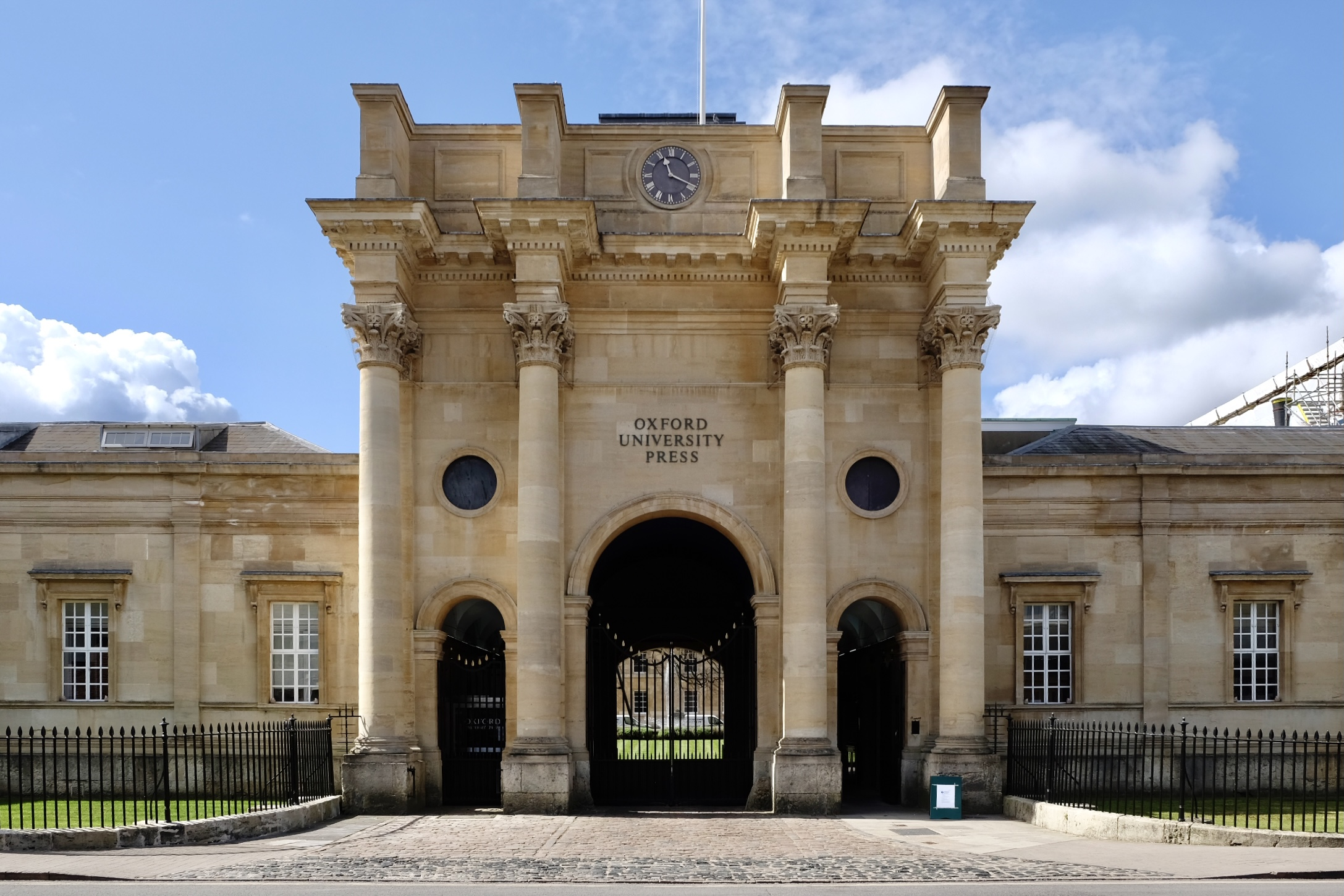
Oxford University Press building from Walton Street

The early 18th century marked a lull in the press's expansion. It suffered from the absence of any figure comparable to Fell. The business was rescued by the intervention of a single Delegate, William Blackstone. Disgusted by the chaotic state of the press and antagonized by Vice-Chancellor George Huddesford, Blackstone called for sweeping reforms that would firmly set out the Delegates' powers and obligations, officially record their deliberations and accounting, and put the print shop on an efficient footing. The university moved to adopt all of Blackstone's reforms by 1760.

By the late 18th century, the press had become more focused. In 1825, the Delegates bought land on Walton Street. Buildings were constructed from plans drawn up by Daniel Robertson and Edward Blore, and the press moved into them in 1830.

=== Commercial growth and scholarly publishing (1830–1900) ===
The press then entered an era of enormous change. In 1830, it was still a joint-stock printing business in an academic backwater, offering learned works to a relatively small readership of scholars and clerics At this time, Thomas Combe joined the press and became the university's Printer until he died in 1872. Combe was a better businessman than most Delegates but still no innovator: he failed to grasp the huge commercial potential of India paper, which grew into one of Oxford's most profitable trade secrets in later years. Even so, Combe earned a fortune through his shares in the business and the acquisition and renovation of the bankrupt paper mill at Wolvercote. Combe showed little interest, however, in producing fine printed work at the press. The best-known text associated with his print shop was the flawed first edition of Alice's Adventures in Wonderland, printed by Oxford at the expense of its author Lewis Carroll (Charles Lutwidge Dodgson) in 1865.

It took the 1850 Royal Commission on the workings of the university and a new Secretary, Bartholomew Price, to shake up the press. Appointed in 1868, Price had already recommended to the university that the press needed an efficient executive officer to exercise "vigilant superintendence" of the business, including its dealings with Alexander Macmillan, who became the publisher for Oxford's printing in 1863 and 1866 helped Price to create the Clarendon Press series of cheap, elementary school books – perhaps the first time that Oxford used the Clarendon imprint. Under Price, the press began to take on its modern shape. Major new lines of work began. For example, in 1875, the Delegates approved the series Sacred Books of the East under the editorship of Friedrich Max Müller, bringing a vast range of religious thought to a wider readership.

Equally, Price moved OUP towards publishing in its own right. The press had ended its relationship with Parker's in 1863 and, in 1870, bought a small London bindery for some Bible work. Macmillan's contract ended in 1880 and was not renewed. By this time, Oxford also had a London warehouse for Bible stock in Paternoster Row, and in 1880, its manager, Henry Frowde (1841–1927), was given the formal title of Publisher to the university. Frowde came from the book trade, not the university, and remained an enigma to many. One obituary in Oxford's staff magazine The Clarendonian admitted, "Very few of us here in Oxford had any personal knowledge of him." Despite that, Frowde became vital to OUP's growth, adding new lines of books to the business, presiding over the massive publication of the Revised Version of the New Testament in 1881 and playing a key role in setting up the press's first office outside Britain, in New York City in 1896.

Price transformed OUP. In 1884, the year he retired as Secretary, the Delegates bought back the last shares in the business. The press was now owned wholly by the university, with its own paper mill, print shop, bindery, and warehouse. Its output had increased to include school books and modern scholarly texts such as James Clerk Maxwell's A Treatise on Electricity & Magnetism (1873), which proved fundamental to Einstein's thought. Without abandoning its traditions or quality of work, Price began to turn OUP into an alert, modern publisher. In 1879, he also took on the publication that led that process to its conclusion: the massive project that became the Oxford English Dictionary (OED).

Offered to Oxford by James Murray and the Philological Society, the "New English Dictionary" was a grand academic and patriotic undertaking. Lengthy negotiations led to a formal contract. Murray was to edit a work estimated to take ten years and to cost approximately £9,000. Both figures were wildly optimistic. The Dictionary began appearing in print in 1884, but the first edition was not completed until 1928, 13 years after Murray's death, costing around £375,000.

The next Secretary, Philip Lyttelton Gell, was appointed by the Vice-Chancellor Benjamin Jowett in 1884 but struggled and was finally dismissed in 1897. The Assistant Secretary, Charles Cannan, was instrumental in Gell's removal. Cannan took over with little fuss and even less affection for his predecessor in 1898: "Gell was always here, but I cannot make out what he did."

=== Contemporary era (1900-present) ===
By the early 20th century, OUP expanded its overseas trade, partly due to the efforts of Humphrey Milford, the publisher of the University of Oxford from 1913 to 1945. The 1920s saw skyrocketing prices of both materials and labour. Paper was hard to come by and had to be imported from South America through trading companies. Economies and markets slowly recovered as the 1920s progressed. In 1928, the press's imprint read 'London, Edinburgh, Glasgow, Leipzig, Toronto, Melbourne, Cape Town, Bombay, Calcutta, Madras and Shanghai'. Not all of these were full-fledged branches: in Leipzig, there was a depot run by H. Bohun Beet, and in Canada and Australia, there were small, functional depots in the cities and an army of educational representatives penetrating the rural fastnesses to sell the press's stock as well as books published by firms whose agencies were held by the press, very often including fiction and light reading. In India, the Branch depots in Bombay, Madras, and Calcutta were imposing establishments with sizeable stock inventories, for the Presidencies themselves were large markets, and the educational representatives there dealt mostly with upcountry trade.

In 1923, OUP established a Music Department. At the time, such musical publishing enterprises, however, were rare. OUP bought an Anglo-French Music Company and all its facilities, connections, and resources. This concentration provided OUP two mutually reinforcing benefits: a niche in music publishing unoccupied by potential competitors and a branch of music performance and composition that the English themselves had largely neglected. Hinnells proposes that the early Music Department's "mixture of scholarship and cultural nationalism" in an area of music with largely unknown commercial prospects was driven by its sense of cultural philanthropy (given the press's academic background) and a desire to promote "national music outside the German mainstream." It was not until 1939 that the Music Department showed its first profitable year.

The Depression of 1929 dried profits from the Americas to a trickle, and India became 'the one bright spot' in an otherwise dismal picture. Bombay was the nodal point for distribution to Africa and onward sale to Australasia, and people who trained at the three major depots later moved to pioneer branches in Africa and Southeast Asia. In 1927–1934 Oxford University Press, Inc., New York, was reorganized by Geoffrey Cumberlege to return it to profitability from the lows of the Depression years. (In 1945–1956, Cumberlege would succeed Milford as publisher to the University of Oxford).

By the end of 2021, OUP USA had published eighteen Pulitzer Prize–winning books. In March 2020, during the COVID-19 pandemic, its Bookshop on the High Street closed. On 27 August 2021, OUP closed Oxuniprint, its printing division. The closure marked the final chapter of OUP's centuries-long history of printing.

=== Clarendon Press ===
OUP came to be known as "(The) Clarendon Press" when printing moved from the Sheldonian Theatre to the Clarendon Building in Broad Street in 1713. The name continued to be used when OUP moved to its present site in Oxford in 1830. The label "Clarendon Press" took on a new meaning when OUP began publishing books through its London office in the early 20th century. To distinguish the two offices, London books were labelled "Oxford University Press" publications, while those from Oxford were labelled "Clarendon Press" books. This labelling ceased in the 1970s when the London office of OUP closed. Today, OUP reserves "Clarendon Press" as an imprint for Oxford publications of particular academic importance.

== Scholarly journals ==
OUP as Oxford Journals has also been a major publisher of academic journals, both in the sciences and the humanities; as of 2024 it publishes more than 500 journals on behalf of learned societies around the world. It has been noted as one of the first university presses to publish an open access journal (Nucleic Acids Research), and probably the first to introduce so-called hybrid open access journals, offering "optional open access" to authors, which provides all readers with online access to their paper free of charge. The "Oxford Open" model applies to the majority of their journals. OUP is a member of the Open Access Scholarly Publishers Association.

OUP is a signatory of the SDG Publishers Compact, and has taken steps to support the achievement of the Sustainable Development Goals (SDGs) in the publishing industry. These include the publishing of a new series of Oxford Open Journals, including Oxford Open Climate Change, Oxford Open Energy, Oxford Open Immunology, Oxford Open Infrastructure and Health, and Oxford Open Digital Health.

== Series and titles ==
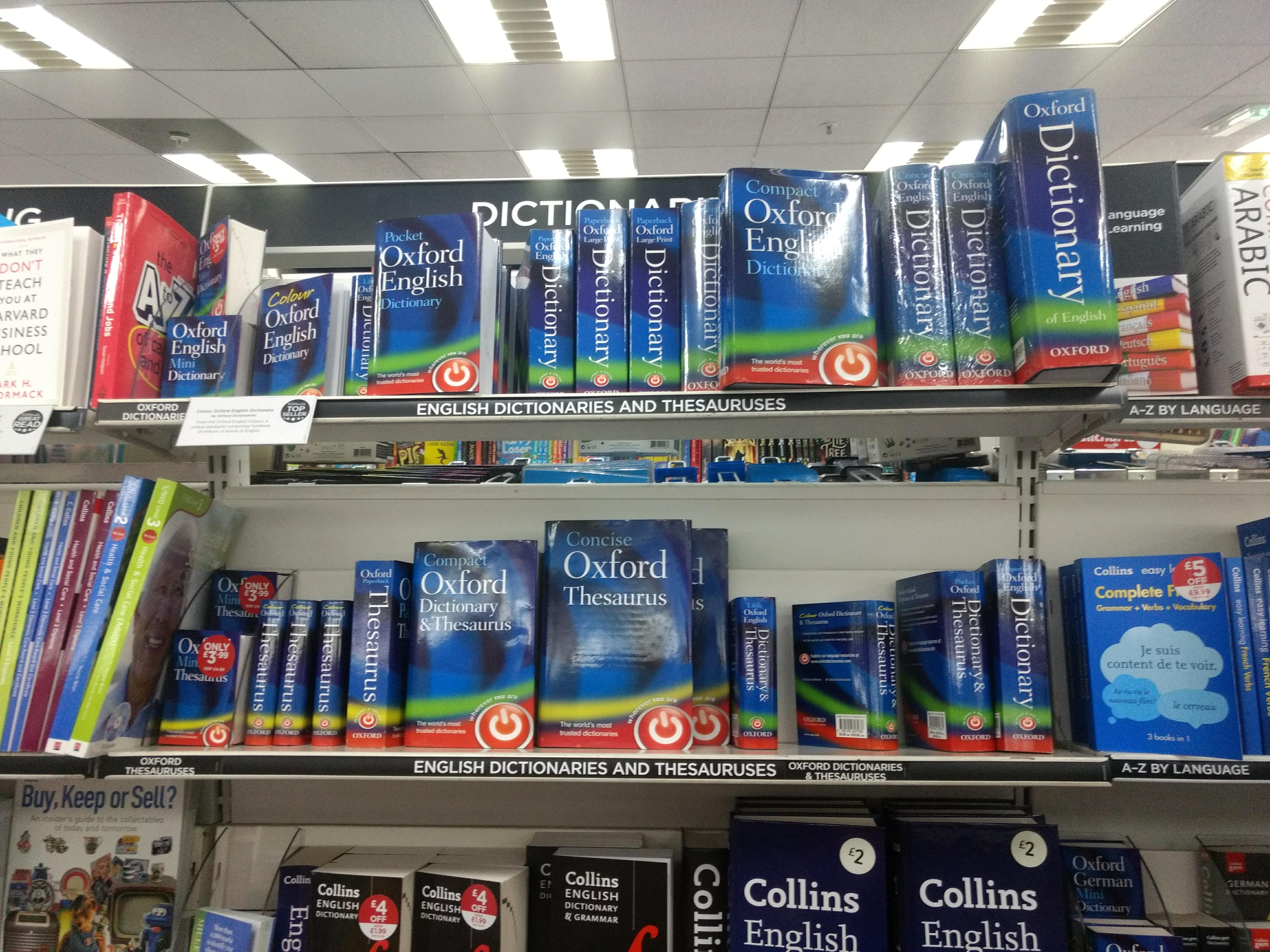
Oxford University Press dictionaries

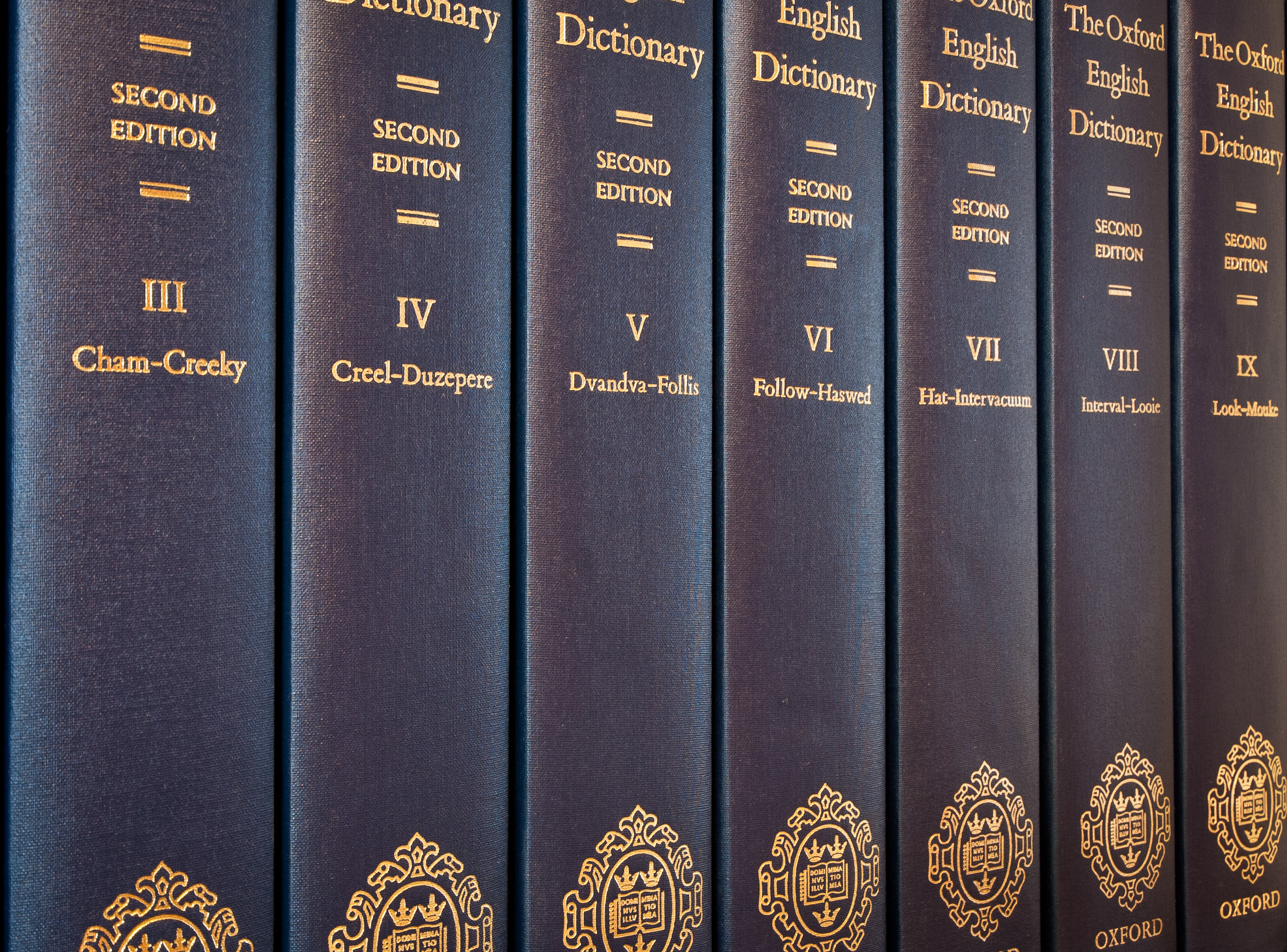
Seven of the twenty volumes of the Oxford English Dictionary (second edition, 1989)

Oxford University Press publishes a variety of dictionaries (e.g. Oxford English Dictionary, Shorter Oxford English Dictionary, Compact Oxford English Dictionary, Compact Editions of the Oxford English Dictionary, Compact Oxford English Dictionary of Current English, Concise Oxford English Dictionary, Oxford Dictionary of Marketing, Oxford Advanced Learner's Dictionary), English as a second or foreign language resources (e.g. Let's Go), English language exams (e.g. Oxford Test of English and the Oxford Placement Test), bibliographies (e.g., Oxford Bibliographies Online), miscellaneous series such as Very Short Introductions, and books on Indology, music, classics, literature, history, Bibles, and atlases. Many of these are published under the Oxford Languages brand.

== Clarendon Scholarships ==
Since 2001, Oxford University Press has financially supported the Clarendon bursary, a University of Oxford graduate scholarship scheme.

== Controversies ==
=== Tehran Book Fair controversy ===
In February 1989, Iran's Ayatollah Khomeini issued a fatwa urging the execution of British author Salman Rushdie and of all involved in the publication of his novel The Satanic Verses. Rushdie went into hiding, and an international movement began to boycott book trading with Iran. There was, therefore, outrage when, in April 1989, OUP broke the worldwide embargo and chose to attend the Tehran Book Fair. OUP justified this by saying, "We deliberated about it quite deeply but felt it certainly wasn't in our interests, or Iran's as a whole, to stay away." The New York Times and The Sunday Times both condemned Oxford's decision.

=== Malcolm vs. Oxford University 1986–1992 ===
In 1990, in the UK Court of Appeal, author Andrew Malcolm won a landmark legal judgment against Oxford University (Press) for its breach of a contract to publish his philosophical text Making Names. Reporting on the verdict in The Observer, Laurence Marks wrote, "It is the first time in living memory that Grub Street has won such a victory over its oppressors". The Appeal Court judges were highly critical of Oxford's conduct of the affair and the litigation.

The case ended in July 1992 with a Tomlin order, a damages settlement under which the servants and agents of Oxford University are permanently barred from denigrating Malcolm or Making Names, rendering it the first book in literary history to be afforded such legal protection. The case was reported to have cost Oxford over £500,000.

=== Closure of poetry list ===
In November 1998, OUP announced the closure, on commercial grounds, of its modern poetry list. Andrew Potter, OUP's director of music, trade paperbacks and Bibles, told The Times that the list "just about breaks even. The university expects us to operate on commercial grounds, especially in this day and age." In the same article, the poet D. J. Enright, who had been with OUP since 1979, said, "There was no warning. It was presented as a fait accompli. Even the poetry editor didn't know....The money involved is peanuts. It's a good list, built up over many years." In February 1999, Arts Minister Alan Howarth made a speech in Oxford in which he denounced the closure: "OUP is not merely a business. It is a department of the University of Oxford and has charitable status. It is part of a great university, which the Government supports financially and which exists to develop and transmit our intellectual culture....It is a perennial complaint by the English faculty that the barbarians are at the gate. Indeed they always are. But we don't expect the gatekeepers themselves, the custodians, to be barbarians." Oxford's professor Valentine Cunningham wrote in the Times Higher Education Supplement: "Increasingly, (OUP) has behaved largely like a commercial outfit, with pound signs in its eyes and a readiness to dumb down for the sake of popularity and sales....Sacking poets not because they lose money but because they do not make enough of it: it is an allegory of a university press missing the point, mistaking its prime purpose." In March 1999 The Times Literary Supplement commissioned Andrew Malcolm to write an article under the strapline "Why the present constitution of the OUP cannot work". A decade later, OUP's managing director, Ivon Asquith, reflected on the public relations damage caused by the episode: "If I had foreseen the self-inflicted wound we would suffer I would not have let the proposal get as far as the Finance Committee."

=== Tax-exemption controversies ===
Since the 1940s, both OUP and the Cambridge University Press (CUP), had made applications to the Inland Revenue for exemption from corporate tax. The first application, by CUP in 1940, was rejected "on the ground that, since the Press was printing and publishing for the outside world and not simply for the internal use of the University, the Press's trade went beyond the purpose and objects of the University and (in terms of the Act) was not exercised in the course of the actual carrying out of a primary purpose of the University." Similar applications by OUP in 1944 and 1950 were also rejected by the Inland Revenue, whose officers repeatedly pointed out that the university presses were in open competition with commercial, tax-liable publishers. In November 1975, CUP's chief executive Geoffrey Cass again applied to the Inland Revenue, and a year later, CUP's tax exemption was quietly conceded. OUP's Chief Executive George Richardson followed suit in 1977. OUP's tax exemption was granted in 1978. The decisions were not made public. The issue was only brought to public attention due to press interest in OUP following the poetry list closure controversy. In 1999, the campaigner Andrew Malcolm published his second book, The Remedy, where he alleged that OUP breached its 1978 tax-exemption conditions. This was reported in a front-page article in The Oxford Times, along with OUP's response.

In March 2001, after a 28-year battle with the Indian tax authorities, OUP lost its tax exemption in India. The Supreme Court ruled that OUP was not tax exempt in the subcontinent "because it does not carry out any university activities there but acts simply as a commercial publisher". To pay off back taxes, owed since the 1970s, OUP was obliged to sell its Mumbai headquarters building, Oxford House. The Bookseller reported that "The case has again raised questions about OUP's status in the UK". In 2003, Joel Rickett of The Bookseller wrote an article in The Guardian describing the resentment of commercial rivals at OUP's tax exemption. Rickett accurately predicted that the funds which would have been paid in tax were "likely to be used to confirm OUP's dominance by buying up other publishers." Between 1989 and 2018, OUP bought out over 70 rival book and journal publishers. In 2007, with the new "public benefit" requirement of the revised Charities Act, the issue was re-examined with particular reference to OUP. In the same year, Malcolm obtained and posted the documents of OUP's applications to the Inland Revenue for tax exemption in the 1940s and 1950s (unsuccessful) and the 1970s (successful). In 2008, CUP's and OUP's privilege was attacked by rival publishers. In 2009, The Guardian invited Andrew Malcolm to write an article on the subject.

=== East African bribery scandal ===
In July 2012, the UK's Serious Fraud Office found OUP's branches in Kenya and Tanzania guilty of bribery to obtain school bookselling contracts sponsored by the World Bank. Oxford was fined £1.9 million "in recognition of sums it received which were generated through unlawful conduct" and barred from applying for World Bank-financed projects for three years.

=== Uyghurs ===
In December 2023, concerns were raised that OUP had published an academic paper based on genetic data taken from the Uyghur population of Xinjiang, a Turkic ethnic group in China. Rhys Blakely, a science correspondent for The Times, reported: "The research has been published online by Oxford University Press (OUP) in a journal that receives financial support from China's Ministry of Justice. The highly unusual deal will raise fears that Oxford risks becoming entangled in human rights abuses against the Uighur community. It will also add to concerns over China's efforts to influence UK academia." In February, OUP announced that it was carrying out internal investigations into two further studies, based on DNA taken from China's Xibe ethnic minority. On 17 May, The Times reported that Oxford had retracted the two studies, quoting a statement from the OUP: "Earlier this year, we were alerted to concerns regarding two papers in Forensics Sciences Research. Based on the information we received, we undertook further investigation and took the decision to retract the papers, in line with industry standard processes."

In July 2025, OUP ended its publication of Forensic Sciences Research (FSR), a journal sponsored by China's Ministry of Justice, following ethical concerns related to research involving DNA data from Uyghur and other ethnic minorities in China. Critics raised issues about the lack of meaningful consent from participants, particularly in regions like Xinjiang, where state surveillance and coercion are prevalent. Several studies published in the journal were conducted or funded by Chinese police and security agencies, raising questions about the independence and ethical standards of the research.

=== OUP Strikes ===
In June 2024, members of the OUP's USA Guild went on strike, and staged a demonstration outside the publisher's Manhattan headquarters. This followed negotiations over new contracts, with the guild accusing the publisher of violating US labour law.

In September 2026, more than 30 UOP finance operations staff took strike action after the OUP announced plans to outsource their department to EXL Services in India. Unite the Union argued that the affected employees would be unable to use TUPE (Transfer of Undertakings (Protection of Employment) regulations) protections. This followed the announcement of plans to make 113 redundancies in the Education and English Language Teaching divisions, as well as 76 redundancies at Karger, a Swiss publisher acquired by OUP in 2025. Union representatives described this as a 'massacre'.

== See also ==
- Category:Oxford University Press academic journals
- Hachette
- Hart's Rules for Compositors and Readers at the University Press, Oxford
- List of largest book publishers of the United Kingdom
- Cambridge University Press v. Patton, a copyright infringement suit in which OUP is a plaintiff
- Harvard University Press
- University of Chicago Press
- Edinburgh University Press
- Express Publishing
- Blavatnik School of Government (opened in 2015), opposite the OUP on Walton Street
