= TrackTest =

English test for non-native English speakers

- Products: Online English proficiency test with certificate
- Services: English Core test, English Complete test, English assessment for schools and companies, online proctoring and verification
- Website: tracktest.eu

TrackTest Online English Assessment Center or TrackTest is an online English language assessment solution launched in November 2012 that measures the English skills of non-native English speakers. The test is using the scale based on Common European Framework of Reference for Languages. It wants to create a 21st-century alternative to expensive pen&paper tests provided by established companies like ETS.
Services for companies and language schools include an easy-to-use online management console for managing tests, analysing results and the progress of their students or candidates. In 2014, TrackTest English Test was used by students from 173 countries and speaking 136 languages. The organisation is an institutional affiliate member of Association of Language Testers in Europe (ALTE), EAQUALS and others.

== Format and scoring ==
TrackTest English proficiency level exams are provided online and are provided in two formats:
1. Core test (receptive skills- grammar, reading, listening) lasts approximately 45 minutes with immediate results. For a successful pass, it is required to achieve 65 per cent or more correctly answered questions.
2. Complete test (both receptive and productive skills- Core test + Speaking&Writing).

Both tests are provided in two versions based on the delivered level of security:
a) Standard – provided online "as is", without the invigilation or proctored by the organisation administering the assessment.
b) Verified – proctored and verified directly by TrackTest. These tests are taken in a proctored online environment with online invigilation via webcam and with the candidate's identity verified by TrackTest. Certificates are equipped with a photo of the candidate.

In 2013, TrackTest introduced TrackTest Score for better progress tracking of users. It is a dynamically calculated numeric score in the range from 0 to 1200 using the algorithm based on all other user results and reflecting the difficulty difference among the levels.
