= American Portuguese =

American Portuguese may refer to:

- Portuguese language in the United States
- Portuguese language in the Americas (North and South America)
- Portuguese Americans, American (United States) people of Portuguese descent
- Americans in Portugal, Portuguese people of American (United States) descent
