= Angolan Americans =

Americans of Angolan birth or descent

Total population
- 1642 (naturalized Angolans and Americans who descend of Angolan immigrants. 2000 US Census); 15,192 (Angolan-born, IOM)

Regions with significant populations
- Mainly Houston, Tulsa, Oklahoma, Boston, MA & Surrounding Areas, Washington D.C & Surrounding Areas, St. Louis, Philadelphia, Phoenix, Atlanta, Los Angeles, Seattle and Chicago There is a growing population in Maine

Languages
- Mainly American English; Portuguese; Porglish; African language

Related ethnic groups
- Cape Verdean Americans; Congolese Americans; Bissau-Guinean Americans; Namibian Americans; Brazilian Americans; Zambian Americans; Macanese Americans; East Timorese Americans; São Tomé and Príncipe Americans; Portuguese Americans; African Americans

Angolan Americans (Portuguese: angolano-americanos) are an ethnic group of Americans of Angolan descent or Angolan immigrants. According to estimates, by the year 2000 there were 1,642 people descended from Angolan immigrants in the United States. However, the number of Angolan Americans is difficult to determine. Many African-Americans are descendants of Angolan enslaved people. In 1644, most of the 6,900 slaves bought on the African coast to clear the forests, lay roads, build houses and public buildings, and grow food came from the established stations in Angola.

== History ==
=== Slavery in the 17th century ===
From the 17th century to the early 19th century, many Angolans were transported via the Atlantic slave trade to the United States. Enslaved Angolans were the first Africans in Virginia, and likely the first in all of the Thirteen Colonies, according to Sheila Walker, an American film maker and researcher in cultural anthropology. This refers to an event in 1617 in Jamestown, Virginia, when Angolan slaves were captured by pirates from a Spanish slave ship bound for New Spain and sent to Jamestown. These first Angolan slaves of Virginia (15 men and 17 women) were Mbundu and Bakongo, who spoke Kimbundu and Kikongo languages respectively. Many of these early slaves were literate. (Note: Following the Portuguese conquest (and according to The Washington Post), many of these first slaves had had contact with Europeans "for many years," specifically since 1484, when the Portuguese ships of Cão reached the Zaire or Congo rivers, the second largest in Africa (after the Nile) and the Portuguese established relationships with the king of the Kongo, Manicongo.)

Later, Angolan slaves were captured by Dutch pirates from the Portuguese when Portuguese slavers left with the slaves from the Portuguese colonial port of São Paulo da Assunção de Loanda (present-day Luanda). Many of these slaves were imported by the Dutch to New York City, which, at this time, was called New Amsterdam and was under Dutch control. Thus, the Angolans also were the first slaves in New York City – among these slaves was Reytory Angola. According to Harvard professor Jill Lepore, the slaves of Angola who arrived in New Amsterdam were also Ambundu and, to a lesser extent, Kongos, as was the case with the first slaves who arrived in Virginia.

In 1621, Angolan former slave Anthony Johnson arrived in Virginia and was the first documented black slave in the Thirteen Colonies to earn his freedom and, in turn, own slaves himself. Anthony Johnson was granted ownership of John Casor after a civil case in 1654. The Angolan slavery trade in the United States reached its greatest magnitude between 1619 and 1650. In 1644, 6,900 slaves on the African coast were purchased to clear the forests, lay roads, build houses and public buildings, and grow food. Most of these were from the company's colonies in the West Indies, but came from its established stations in Angola.

=== 18th–19th centuries ===
During the colonial period, people from the region Congo-Angola made up 25% of the slaves in North America. Based on the data mentioned, many Angolan slaves came from distinct ethnic groups, such as the Bakongo, the Tio and Northern Mbunbu people (from Kingdom of Ndongo). However, not all slaves kept the culture of their ancestors. The Bakongo, from the kingdom of Kongo, were Catholics, who had voluntarily converted to Catholicism in 1491 after the Portuguese established trade relations in this territory. Senegambian slaves were the preferred slaves in South Carolina but Angolans were the most numerous and represented around a third of the slaves population. In Virginia, most slaves came from within the boundaries of the modern nation-states of Nigeria and Angola. Between 1710 and 1769, only 17% of the slaves who arrived in Virginia were from Angola. Others places in the United States, such as Delaware and Indiana, also had Angolan slaves. Georgia imported also many slaves from the Congo-Angola region. Many of these early enslaved people from Angola along with others from the Congo were brought to the royal colony of New York while the other enslaved people in the French colony of Saint-Domingue (modern-day Haiti) in the coastal port city of Cap-Français (now Cap-Haïtien) were also from various parts of Africa including Angola.

Many of the Bakongo slaves who arrived in the United States in the 18th century were captured and sold as slaves by African kings to other tribes or enemies during several civil wars. Some of the people sold from Kongo to the United States were trained soldiers. In 1739, there was an uprising in South Carolina, where possibly 40% of the slaves were Angolan. This uprising, known as the Stono Rebellion, was led by an Angolan named Jemmy, who led a group of 20 Angolan slaves, probably Bakongos and described as Catholic. The slaves mutinied and killed at least 20 white settlers and several children. They then marched to Charlestown, where the uprising was harshly repressed. Forty of the slaves in the revolt (some Angolans) were decapitated and their heads strung on sticks to serve as a warning to others. This episode precipitated legislation banning the importation of slaves. The ban was aimed at solving two serious problems: the inhumanity toward the black slaves and the fact the country had more blacks than whites. Later, some 300 former Angolan slaves founded their own community in the Braden River delta, near what is now downtown Bradenton, Florida. They gave it the name of Angola, in honor of the homeland of many of them, and tried to live as free men. However, this Angola was destroyed in 1821. Rich hunters and slaveholders hired 200 mercenaries and captured 300 black people and burned their houses. It is believed, however, that some Angolans fled in rafts and successfully reached Andros Island in The Bahamas, where their lives were established.

=== Recent emigration ===
Large-scale Angolan immigration to the United States began in the 1970s, fleeing regional wars in their country. Initially, most Angolans refugees emigrated to France, Belgium, and Portugal – the country to which Angola belonged in colonial times and with which they share a language. But in the 1980s, European Economic Community restrictions on immigration forced many of them to emigrate to other countries, such as the United States. Before that, only 1,200 Angolans had emigrated to the US. Between 1980 and 1989, 1,170 Angolans entered the US; between 1990 and 2000, 1,995 more arrived. 4,365 Angolans were registered as living in the United States in 2000.

They settled primarily in Philadelphia, St. Louis, Phoenix, and Chicago. There are also some Angolans in Brockton, Massachusetts, attracted to the area by the presence of the established, Portuguese-speaking Cape Verdean community. In 1992, leaders of the Angolan communities of these cities formed the Angolan Community in the USA (ACUSA). The Chicago branch has aided new immigrants.

== Demography ==
Currently, most Americans who are descendants of Angolan immigrants to the United States speak Portuguese and English. Despite the large family sizes in Angola, most Angolan immigrants in United States are single men or small family groups. In cities such as Chicago, Angolan communities tend to celebrate Angolan festivals, listen to Angolan music or read newspapers about events that occur in Angola. The main communities are concentrated in Philadelphia, St. Louis, Phoenix and Chicago. Meanwhile, the states with the largest Angolan-American communities are Massachusetts, Pennsylvania, Connecticut and New Jersey. There is also a growing population in Maine. Although according to estimates, by 2000 there were only 1,642 people of Angolan origin in the U.S., according to the same census for that year, 4,365 Angolan-born people lived in the United States, of whom 1,885 were white, 1,635 black, 15 of Asian origin, 620 racially mixed and another 210 of unspecified race.

== Legacy ==
- The term "Gullah" (referring to an ethnic group of African, and Caribbean origin and African language and culture – Gullah people – established in parts of Virginia, South Carolina and Georgia) derive from an Angolan word.
- "Angola" became the name given to the communities created by Angolan slave fugitives and the term itself came to represent the struggle for freedom.
- Several anthropologists and American historians are involved in Project called Angola, the historical study of the various Angolans living in the U.S.
- In Louisiana, about 50 miles from Baton Rouge, there is a place called Angola. This is an old plantation of 7,200 hectares, where most of the slaves were from Angola and, in 1835, became the prison State of Louisiana, known today by The Farm or Angola.
- There are several U.S. cities named "Angola" – such as ones in New York, Delaware and Indiana – where there were Angolan slaves.
- Virginia also had a farm called "Angola", owned by Anthony Johnson, an Angolan who took the name of his boss when he was released.

== Notable people ==
- Anthony Johnson
- Gullah Jack
- Chris Tucker

== See also ==
- Southern Africans in the United States
- Angola–United States relations
