= Latin Portuguese =

Latin Portuguese may refer to:

- Latin American Portuguese, or more specifically:
  - Brazilian Portuguese
  - Uruguayan Portuguese
- Latin–Portuguese, a pre-modern Portuguese orthography
