= Portuguese Americans =

Americans of Portuguese birth or descent

Luso-americanos (Portuguese)
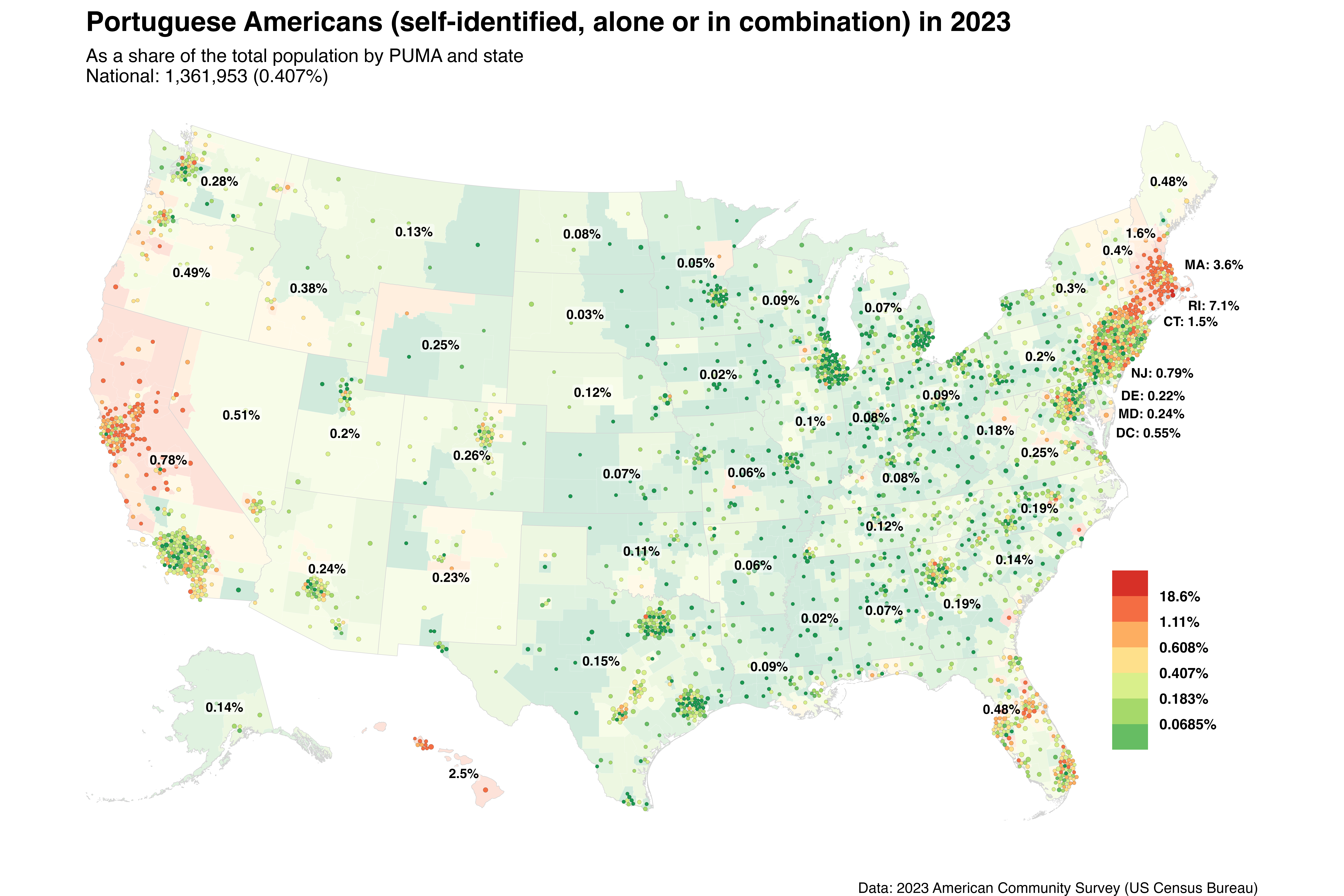

Total population
- Portuguese ancestry 1,454,262 (2020); 0.42% of the US population

Regions with significant populations
- California, Florida, New Jersey, New York, Massachusetts, Hawaii, Rhode Island, Connecticut

Languages
- American English; American Portuguese; European Portuguese; Porglish

Religion
- Predominantly; Roman Catholic

Related ethnic groups
- Portuguese people; Portuguese Canadians; White Americans; Bissau-Guinean Americans; Cape Verdean Americans; Angolan Americans; Mozambican Americans; São Toméan Americans; East Timorese Americans; Macanese Americans; Brazilian Americans; Spanish Americans

Portuguese Americans (Portuguese: portugueses americanos), also known as Luso-Americans (luso-americanos), are citizens and residents of the United States who are connected to the country of Portugal by birth, ancestry, or citizenship.

Americans and others who are not native Europeans from Portugal but originate from countries that were former colonies of Portugal do not necessarily self-identify as "Portuguese American", but rather as their post-colonial nationalities, although many refugees (referred to as retornados) from former Portuguese colonies, as well as many white Brazilians, are ethnically or ancestrally Portuguese. In 2017, an estimated 48,158 Portuguese nationals were living in the United States.

== History ==
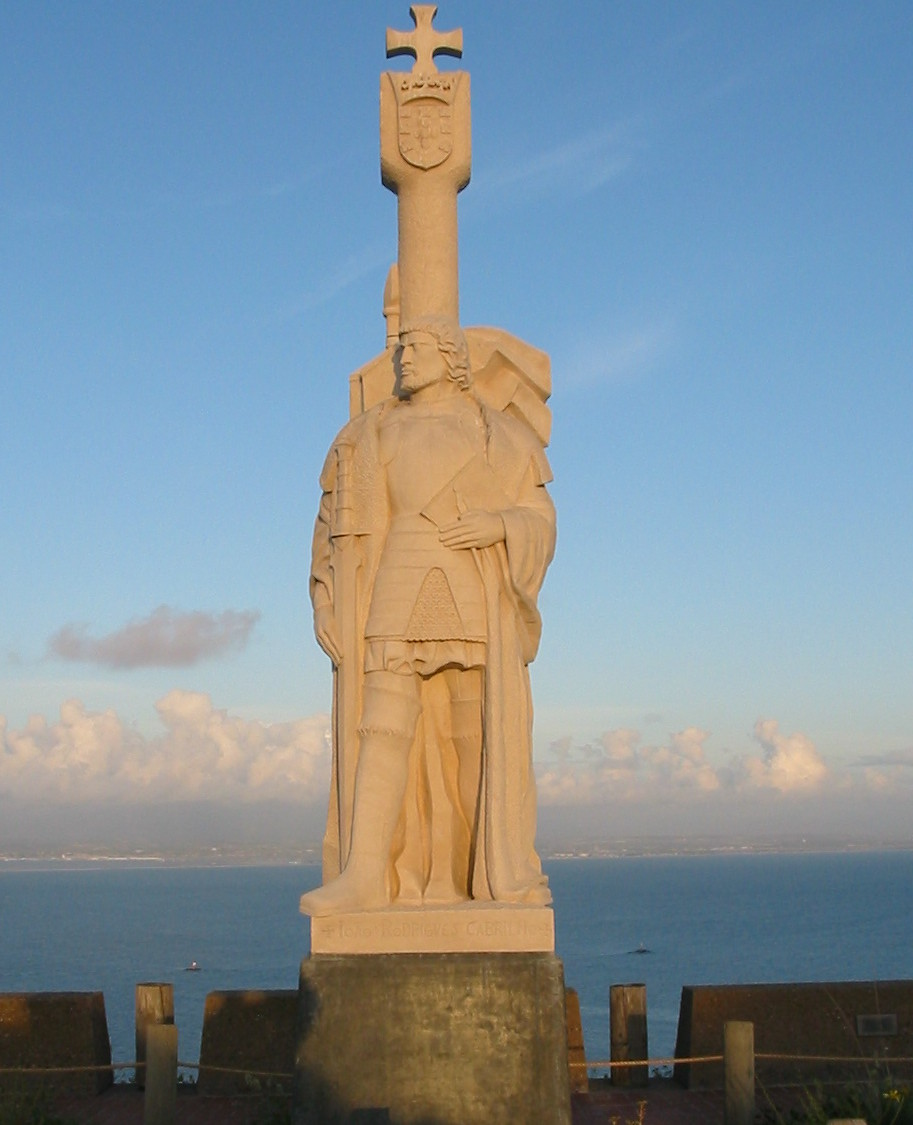
Cabrillo National Monument in San Diego honors João Rodrigues Cabrilho, the first European to reach California in 1542.

Some of the earliest European explorers to reach continental North America in the Age of Discovery were Portuguese explorers, such as João Fernandes Lavrador. Navigators, like the Miguel Corte-Real family, may have visited the North American shores at the beginning of the 16th century. João Rodrigues Cabrilho was a Portuguese navigator who became the first European to reach California in 1542.

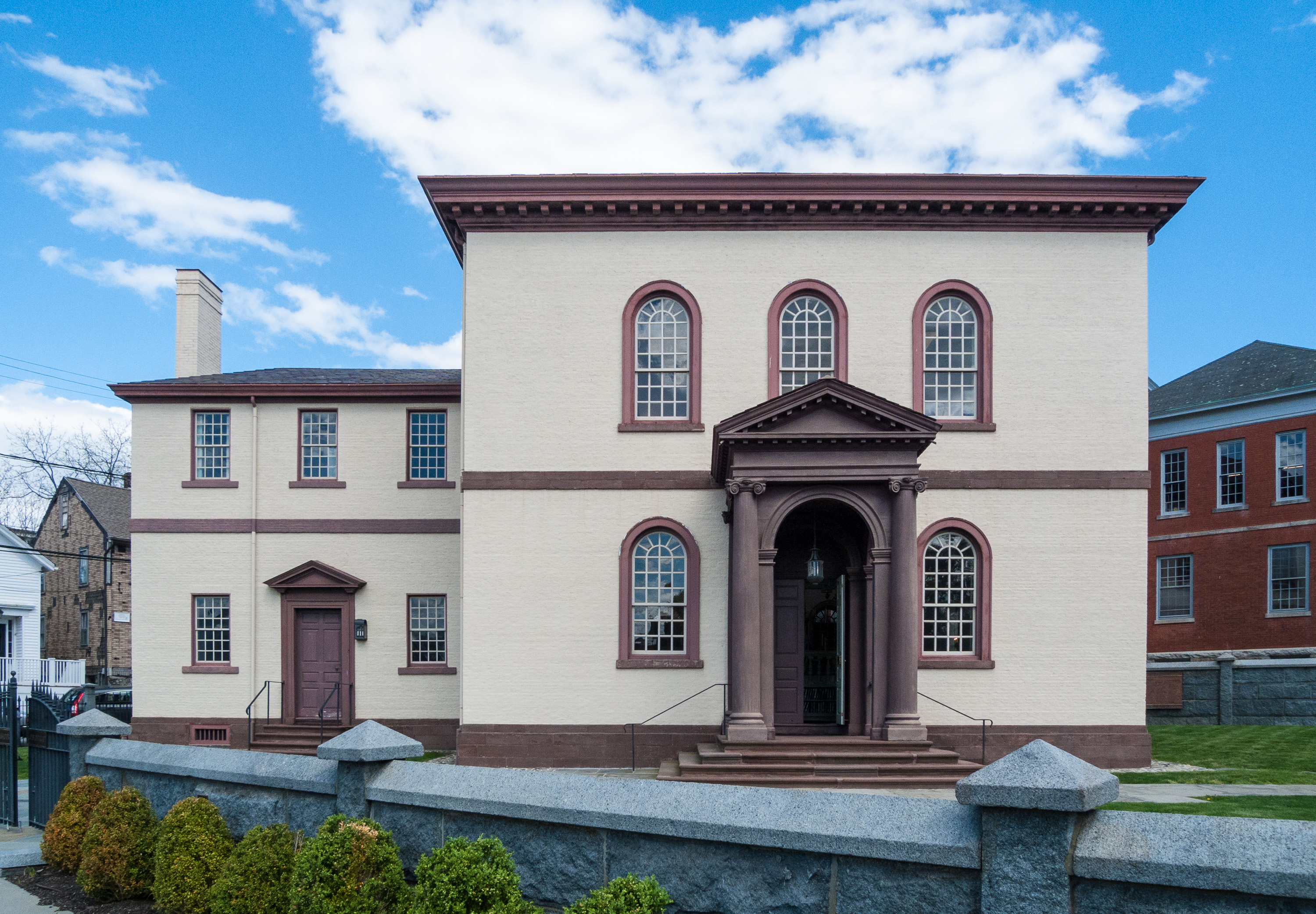
Touro Synagogue in Newport, Rhode Island, was founded by Portuguese Jews in 1763.

Portuguese people have emigrated to the modern United States since 1634. The first documented Portuguese to live in colonial America was Mathias de Sousa, possibly a Sephardic Jew of mixed African background. The oldest synagogue in the country, the Touro Synagogue, is named after one of these early Portuguese Jews, Isaac Touro.

During the Colonial period, there was some Portuguese immigration, especially to the islands of Martha's Vineyard and Nantucket, Massachusetts. Some Portuguese people settled in the Southwest of what is now the United States, when it belonged to Spain. Francisco Gomes, a native of Portugal, governed Santa Fe de Nuevo Mexico between 1641 and 1642 and was one of the first colonists in the region.

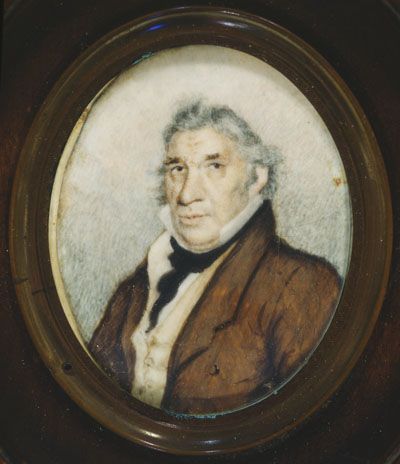
Peter Francisco was an Azorean born patriot of the American Revolutionary War.

Some Portuguese probably participated in the American Revolutionary War. For example, Peter Francisco is generally thought to have been born Portuguese from the Azores.

Following the American Revolutionary War, Portugal was the first neutral country to recognize the United States.

Prior to the twentieth century, whaling ships were a common way Portuguese people came to the US. In the early 1700s, Massachusetts dominated the whaling industry with Nantucket, Cape Cod and New Bedford. By the early 19th century, New Bedford had become the center of whaling in America. When whalers were out at sea, they would frequently stop in the Azores to recruit crew members for help. At the end of their voyage, they docked in New England, where crew members often settled as immigrants.

In the late 19th century, many Portuguese, mainly Azoreans and Madeirans, emigrated to the eastern U.S., establishing communities in New England coastal cities, primarily but not limited to Tiverton, East Providence, Valley Falls, and Pawtucket in Rhode Island, and Taunton, Brockton, Fall River, and New Bedford in Southeastern Massachusetts.

Another part of Massachusetts that attracted many Portuguese immigrants was Northern Massachusetts, most notably Lowell and Lawrence. Many also settled in nearby Southern New Hampshire. Massachusetts became a key destination because of the abundance of low skill jobs, especially in the textile industry. Since many migrants arrived in the United States with limited English proficiency, these jobs were among the most accessible. The reliance on low-skill work reflected both the limited educational opportunities available in Portugal at the time and the scarcity of better jobs during the nineteenth century.

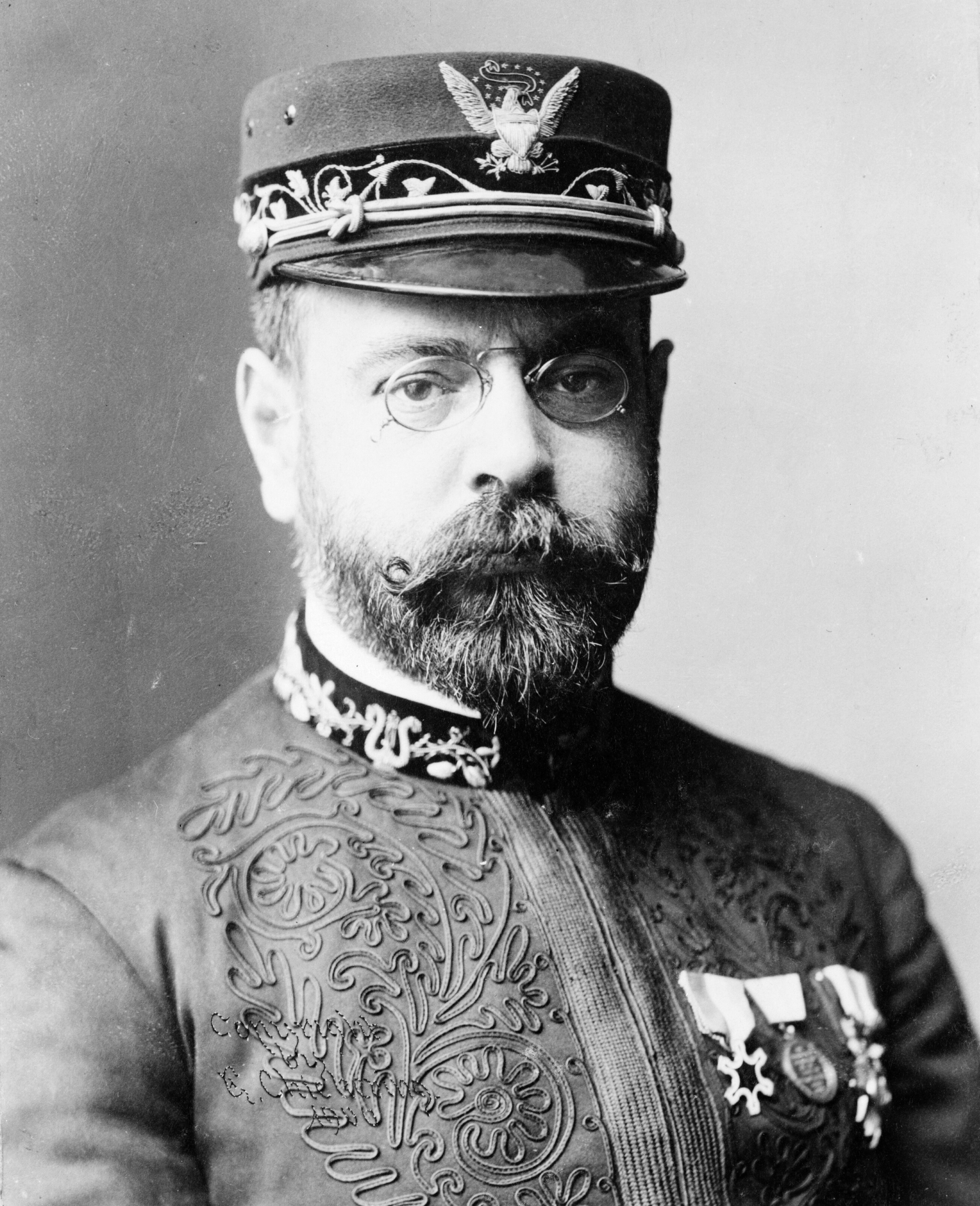
Renowned composer and conductor John Philip Sousa

A number of Portuguese immigrants settled in the city of Boston. These Portuguese immigrants mainly settled in East Boston and North End. In addition, many Portuguese immigrants also went to Cambridge and Somerville.

A Portuguese community existed in the vicinity of the Carpenter Street Underpass in Springfield, Illinois, one of the earliest and largest Portuguese settlements in the Midwestern United States. By the early twentieth century, the project area represented the western extension of a neighborhood known as the "Badlands." The Badlands was included in the widespread destruction and violence of the Springfield Race Riot in August 1908, an event that led to the formation of the National Association for the Advancement of Colored People (NAACP). The Carpenter Street archaeological site possesses local and national significance for its potential to contribute to an understanding of the lifestyles of multiple ethnic/racial groups in Springfield during the nineteenth and early twentieth centuries.

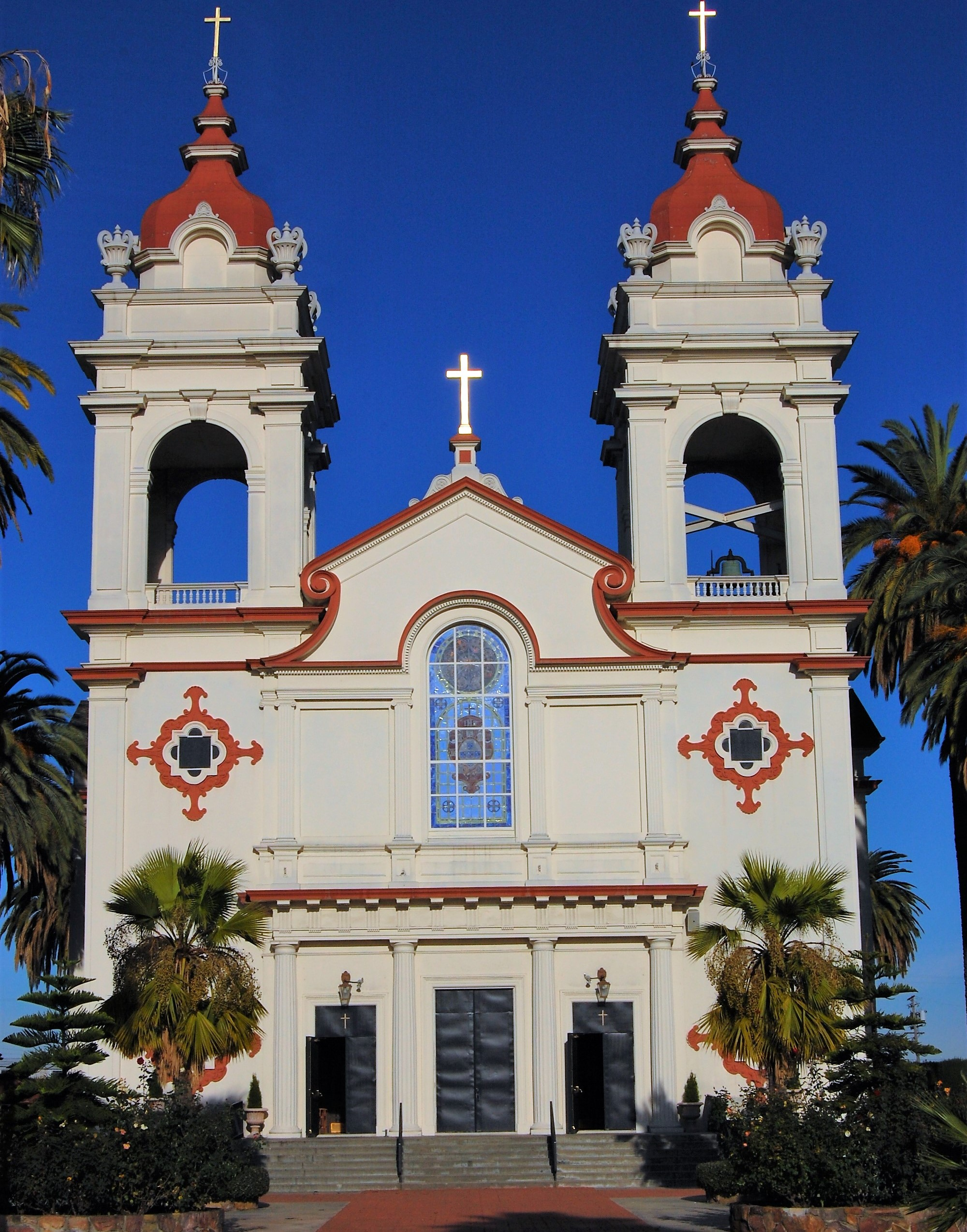
Portuguese National Church, in the Little Portugal neighborhood of San Jose, California

There are several Portuguese communities in California in cities like San Francisco, Oakland, San Jose, and Santa Cruz, as well as in dairy farming areas in the Central Valley, the Los Angeles Basin, and San Diego. Many Portuguese immigrated to California from the Azores. There are also connections with Portuguese communities in the Pacific Northwest in Astoria, Oregon, and Seattle, Washington, and British Columbia, Canada as well.

Many of the Portuguese communities on the West Coast were farming towns. Portuguese who moved to California often saved money to buy land to start farming. Portuguese farmers in California and along the West Coast of the United States often hired other Portuguese migrants as farm hands. Aside from farming, Portuguese migrants also were able to secure jobs as fishermen in port cities.

Portuguese migration to Hawaii occurred often in the late nineteenth century due to the availability of labor contracts on the islands. Labor contracts paid for the migration of entire families. This was enticing for families looking to migrate without the means or the desire to migrate in stages. This led to families having to work off debt before they could move off of the island. Often times Portuguese migrants decided just to remain in Hawaii despite there being little opportunity for improving their lives.

=== 20th century ===
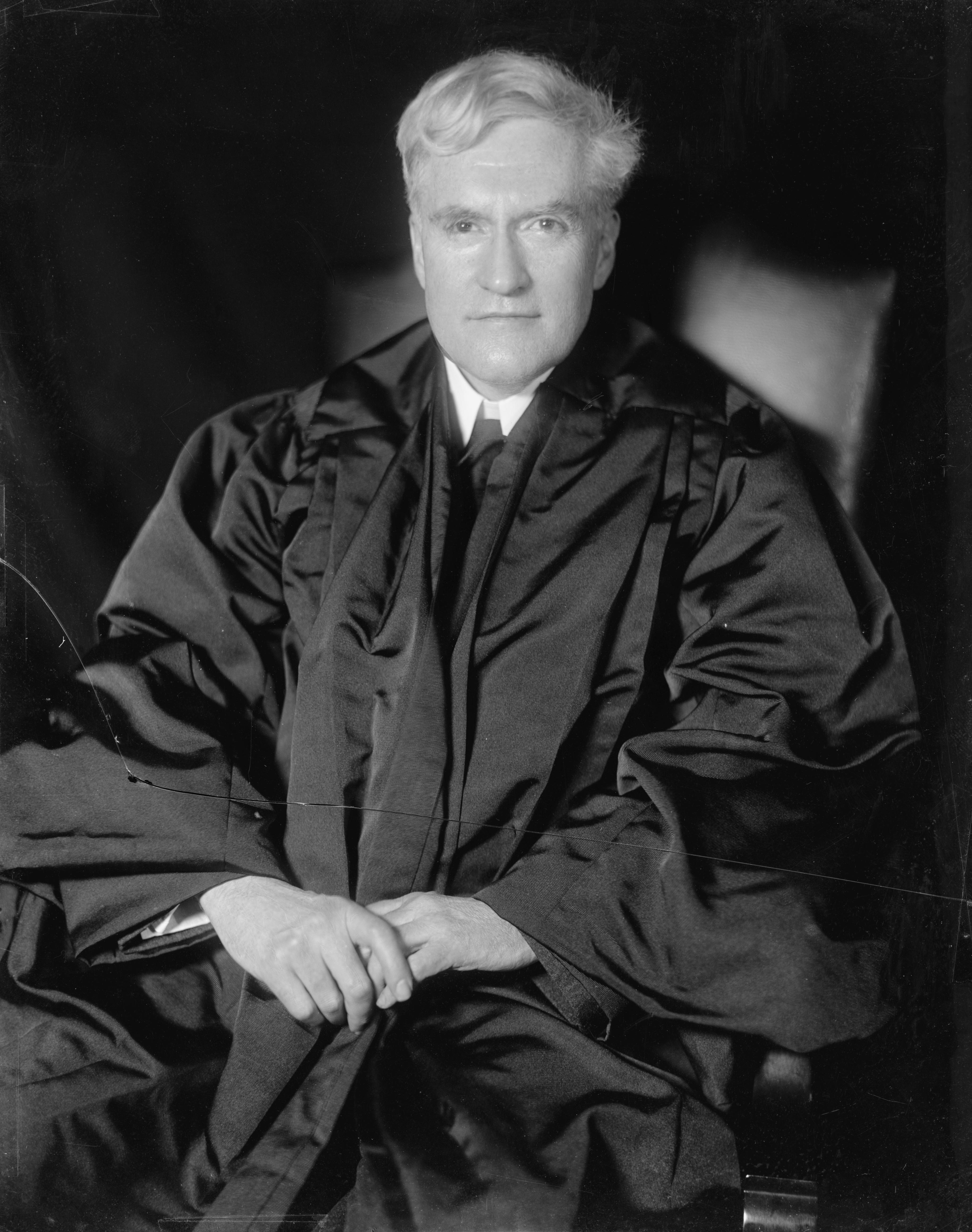
Benjamin N. Cardozo served on the United States Supreme Court in the 1930's.

After World War II, there was another wave of Portuguese immigration to the country, mainly in the northeastern United States (New Jersey, New York, Connecticut, Rhode Island, Massachusetts and Maryland), and also in California. Many were fleeing the right-wing dictatorship of Antonio Salazar. There are Portuguese clubs, principally in the larger cities of these states, which operate with the intention of promoting sociocultural preservation as venues for community events, athletics, etc.

Many Portuguese Americans may include descendants of Portuguese settlers born in Africa (like Angola, Cape Verde, and Mozambique) and Asia (mostly Macanese people), as well Oceania (Timor-Leste). There were around one million Portuguese Americans in the United States by 2000.

A general contribution the Portuguese people have made to American music is the ukulele, which originated in Madeira and was initially popularized in the Kingdom of Hawaii. John Philip Sousa was a famous Portuguese American composer most known for his patriotic compositions.

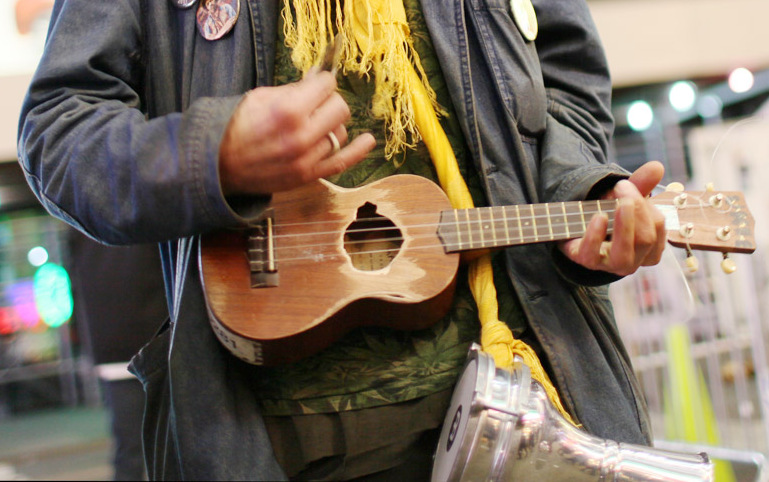
The Ukulele is one of the most notable Portuguese contributions to American culture, originally brought by Madeiran immigrants to Hawaii.

A large amount of mingling took place between Chinese and Portuguese in Hawaii. There were very few marriages between European and Chinese people with the majority being between Portuguese and Chinese people. These unions between Chinese men and Portuguese women resulted in children of mixed parentage, called Chinese-Portuguese. For two years to June 30, 1933, 38 of these children were born; they were classified as pure Chinese because their fathers were Chinese. These marriages are in marked contrast to the situation in Macau, where very few Han Chinese married Portuguese settlers; instead, the Portuguese mixed with indigenous Tanka people, leading to the Macanese people.

As with other immigrants that arrived in America, several Portuguese surnames have been changed to align with more American sounding names, for example Rodrigues to Rogers, Oliveira to Oliver, Martins to Martin, Pereira to Perry, Moraes or Morais to Morris, Magalhães to McLean, Souto to Sutton, Moura to Moore, Serrão to Serran, Silva to Silver or Sylvia, Rocha to Rock (or Stone), Madeira or Madeiros to Wood, Pontes to Bridges, Fernandes to Frederick, Costa to Charlie, Emo or Emos to Emma and Santos to Stan.

==== Azorean Refugee Act of 1958 ====
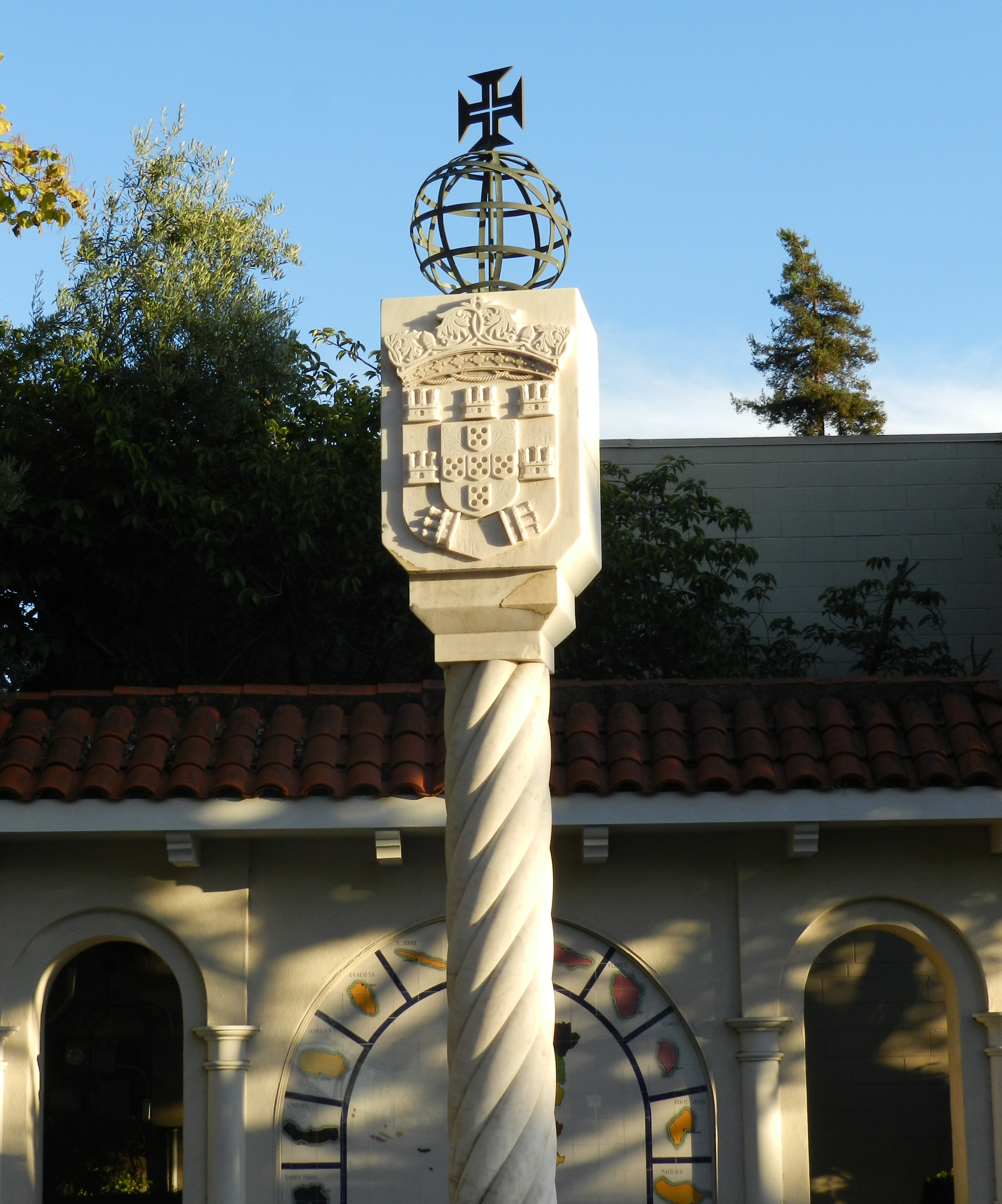
Portuguese Centenniel Park in Hayward, California

In 1957–58, the Capelinhos volcano erupted on the Azorean island of Faial, causing massive destruction from lava and smoke. In response, then Senators John F. Kennedy and John Pastore co-sponsored an Azorean Refugee Act. President Dwight Eisenhower signed the legislation in 1958, making 1,500 visas available to the victims of the eruption. An extension was enabled in 1962, providing opportunities for even more immigrants.

This was followed by the passage of the Immigration and Nationality Act of 1965, which allowed those legally in the United States to serve as sponsors for family members, offering a path to permanent residence. This act dramatically increased Portuguese immigration into the 1970s and 1980s.

According to the 2000 United States census, there were 1,176,615 Portuguese-Americans, the majority being of Azorean descent.

== Institutions ==
Portuguese formed mutual aid and fraternal societies in the United States. The Portuguese Fraternal Society of America (PFSA) was formed in 2010 as a merger of four Portuguese American fraternal societies. The PFSA owns and operates the J.A. Freitas Library in San Leandro, California.

The University of Massachusetts Dartmouth operates the Ferreira-Mendes Portuguese-American Archives.

== Literature ==
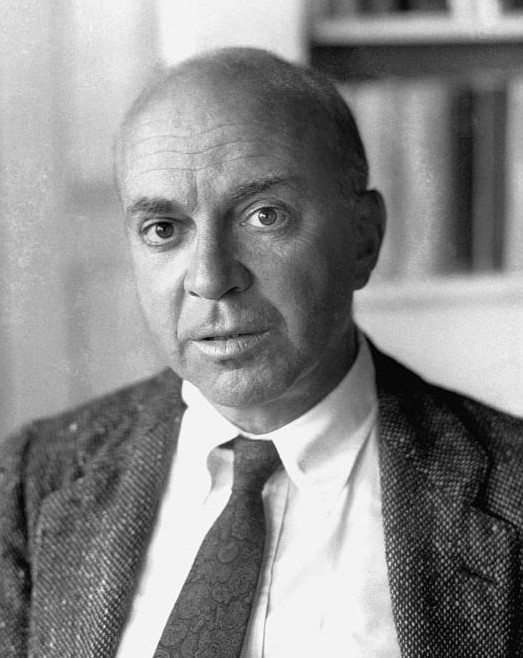
Renowned 20th-century novelist John Dos Passos

There are four anthologies of Portuguese-American literature: Luso-American Literature: Writings by Portuguese-Speaking Authors in North America edited by Robert Henry Moser and António Luciano de Andrade Tosta and published in 2011, The Gávea-Brown Book of Portuguese-American Poetry edited by Alice R. Clemente and George Monteiro, published in 2013, Writers of the Portuguese Diaspora in the United States and Canada: An Anthology edited by Luís Gonçalves and Carlo Matos, published in 2015, and Behind the Stars, More Stars: The Tagus/Disquiet Collection of New Luso-American Writing edited by Christopher Larkosh and Oona Patrick, published in 2019 by Tagus Press.

A list of accomplished writers include: Katherine Vaz, Frank X. Gaspar, Millicent Borges Accardi, Sam Pereira, Nancy Vieira Couto, Alfred Lewis, Charles Reis Felix, Michael Garcia Spring and John dos Passos.

In recent years, the Portuguese in the Americas Series at Tagus Press at UMass Dartmouth has been particularly active in publishing works by Portuguese-American authors, the most recent of these being The Poems of Renata Ferreira, by Frank X. Gaspar, published in 2020.

== Demography ==
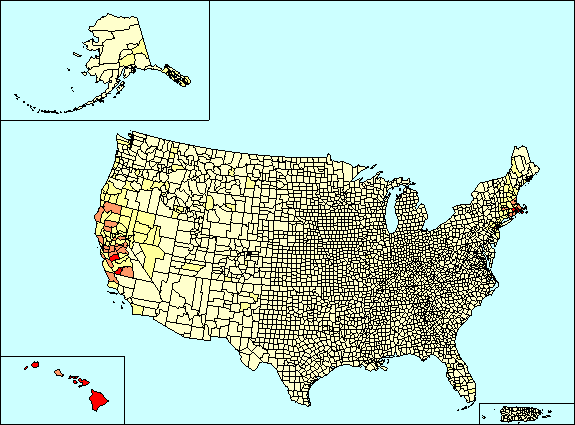
Portuguese ancestry in the United States in the 2000 census

Portuguese-Americans are the fourth largest ethnic group in the state of Hawaii, fifth largest group in Rhode Island and the eighth largest group in Massachusetts.

=== Largest communities ===
Portuguese-American communities in the U.S. according to the 5 Year Estimates of the (2016 American Community Survey):

U.S. by Ancestry: 1,367,476
U.S. by Country of Birth: 176,286

Top CSAs by Ancestry:

Portuguese in California

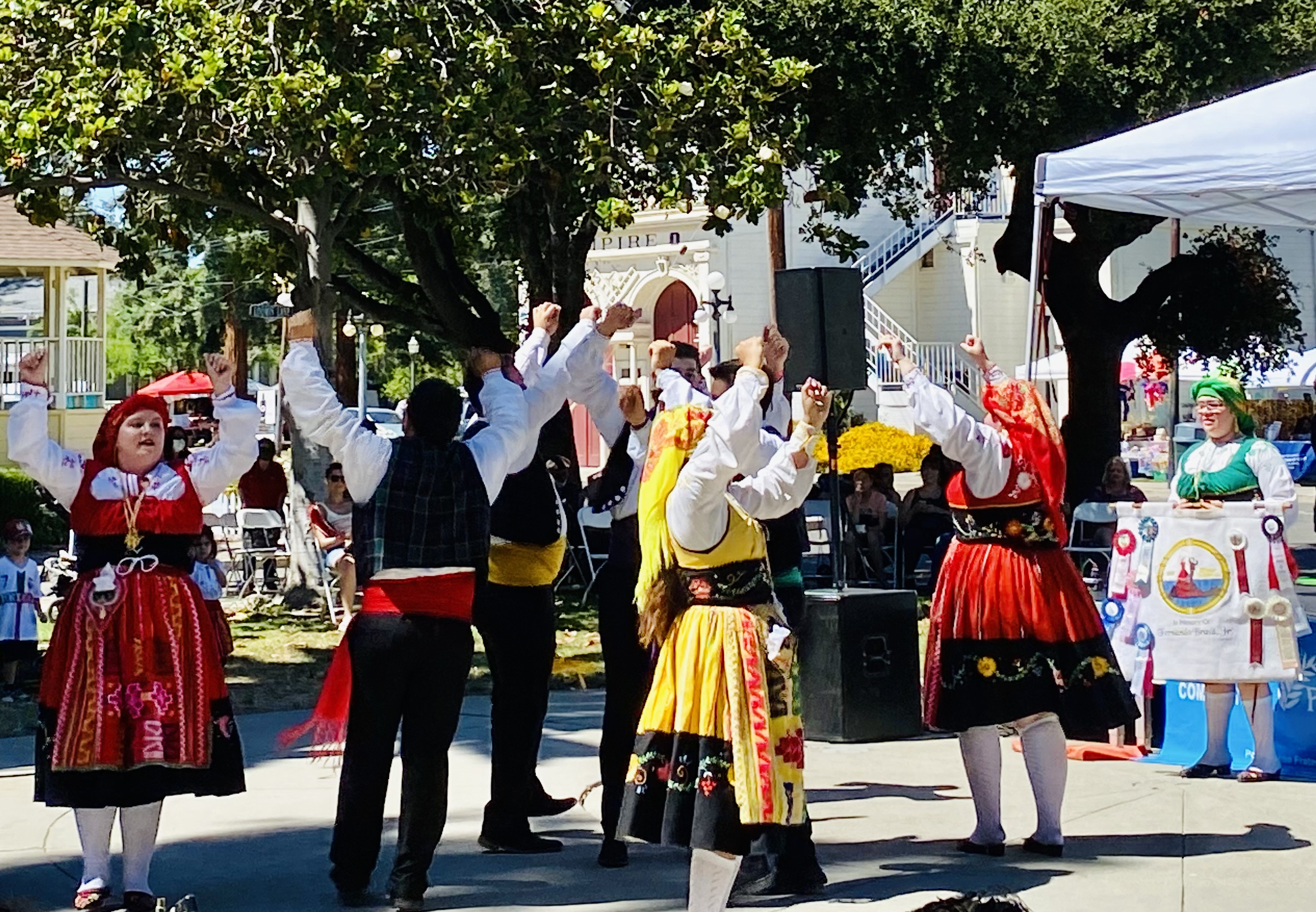
Portugal Day festa in San Jose

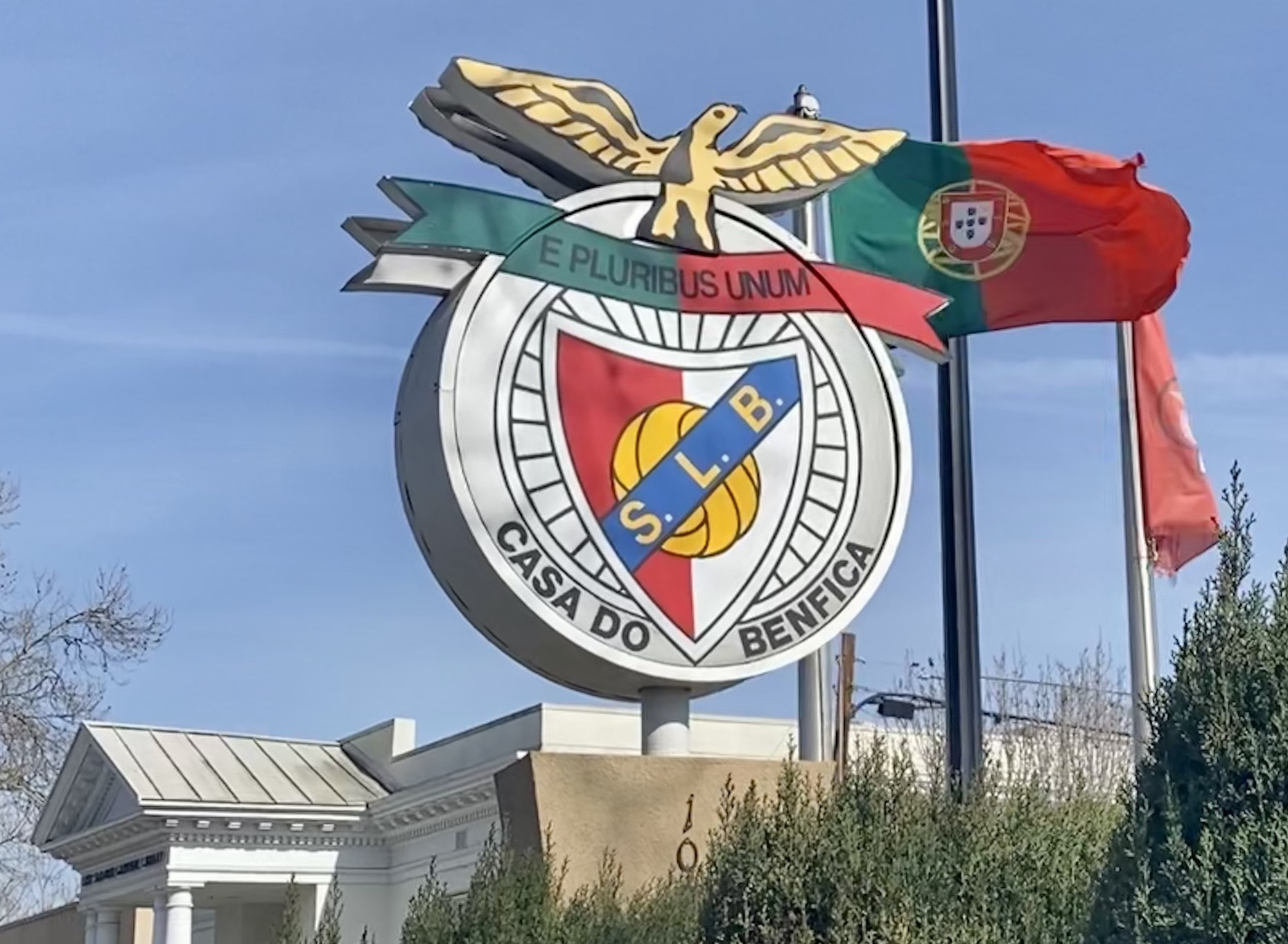
Casa do Benfica in Little Portugal

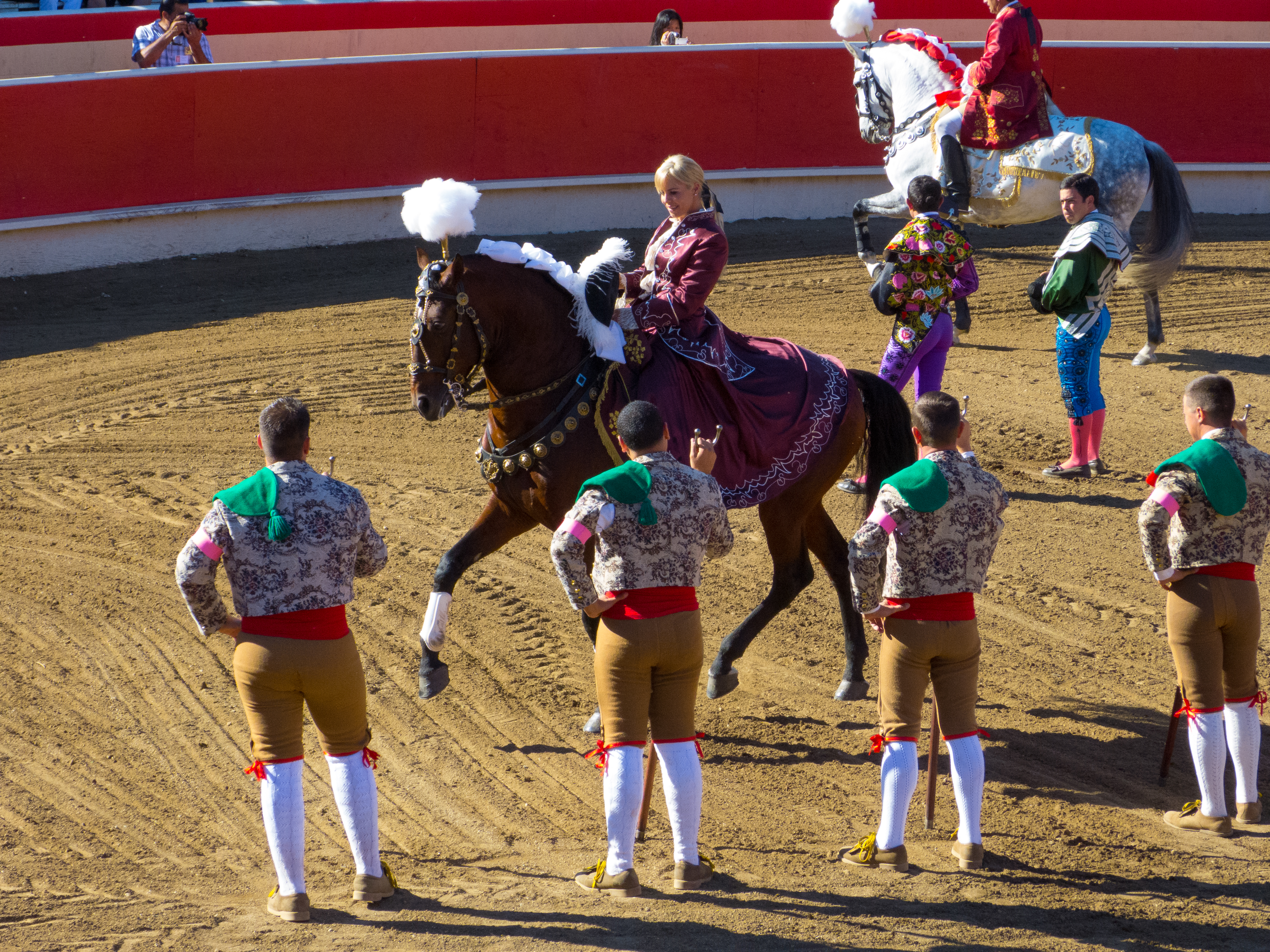
Portuguese bullfighting in Thornton

1. Boston-Worcester-Manchester, MA-RI-NH CSA: 393,457
2. New York-Newark-Bridgeport, NY-NJ-CT-PA CSA: 141,522
3. San Jose-San Francisco-Oakland, CA CSA: 124,652
4. Los Angeles-Long Beach-Riverside, CA CSA: 49,465
5. Sacramento-Arden-Arcade-Yuba City, CA-NV CSA: 40,972
6. Modesto-Merced, CA CSA: 38,031
7. Miami-Fort Lauderdale-Port St. Lucie, FL CSA: 21,842
8. Hartford-East Hartford, CT CSA: 21,599
9. Philadelphia-Reading-Camden, PA-NJ-DE-MD CSA: 14,245

Top CSAs by Country of Birth:

1. Boston-Worcester-Manchester, MA-RI-NH CSA: 68,875
2. New York-Newark-Bridgeport, NY-NJ-CT-PA CSA: 47,964
3. San Jose-San Francisco-Oakland, CA CSA: 10,570
4. Modesto-Merced, CA CSA: 5,841
5. Hartford-East Hartford, CT CSA: 3,873
6. Miami-Fort Lauderdale-Port St. Lucie, FL CSA: 3,493
7. Los Angeles-Long Beach, CA CSA: 3,153
8. Springfield-Greenfield Town, MA CSA: 3,105
9. Philadelphia-Reading-Camden, PA-NJ-DE-MD CSA: 2,610

Top States by Country of Birth:

1. California: 350,011
2. Massachusetts: 265,455
3. Hawaii: 91,003
4. Florida: 84,486
5. Rhode Island: 83,414
6. New Jersey: 82,964
7. New York: 58,093
8. Connecticut: 50,077
9. Texas: 40,688
10. Washington: 28,048
Portuguese in Rhode Island

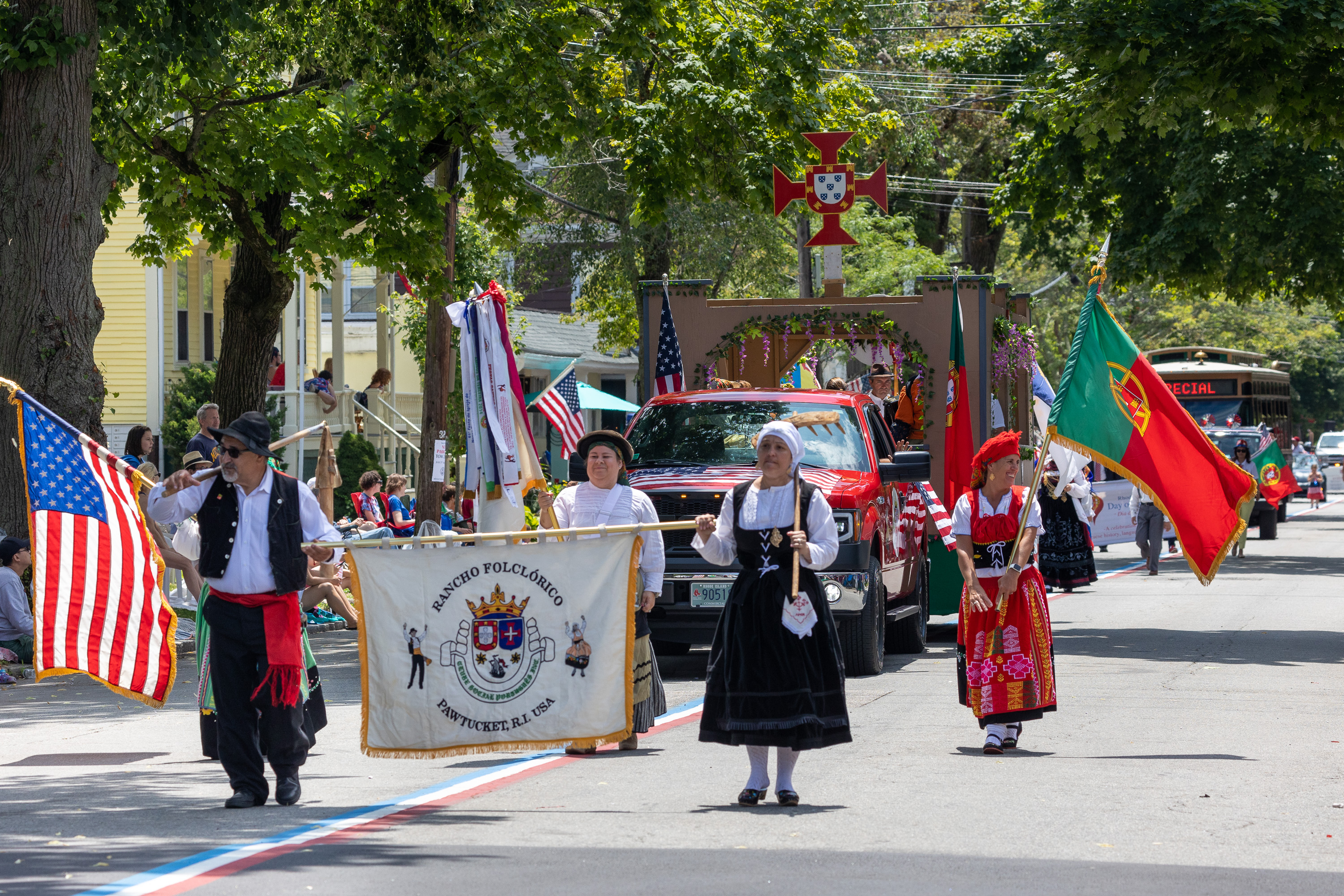
Rancho Folclórico of Pawtucket in the Bristol Fourth of July Parade

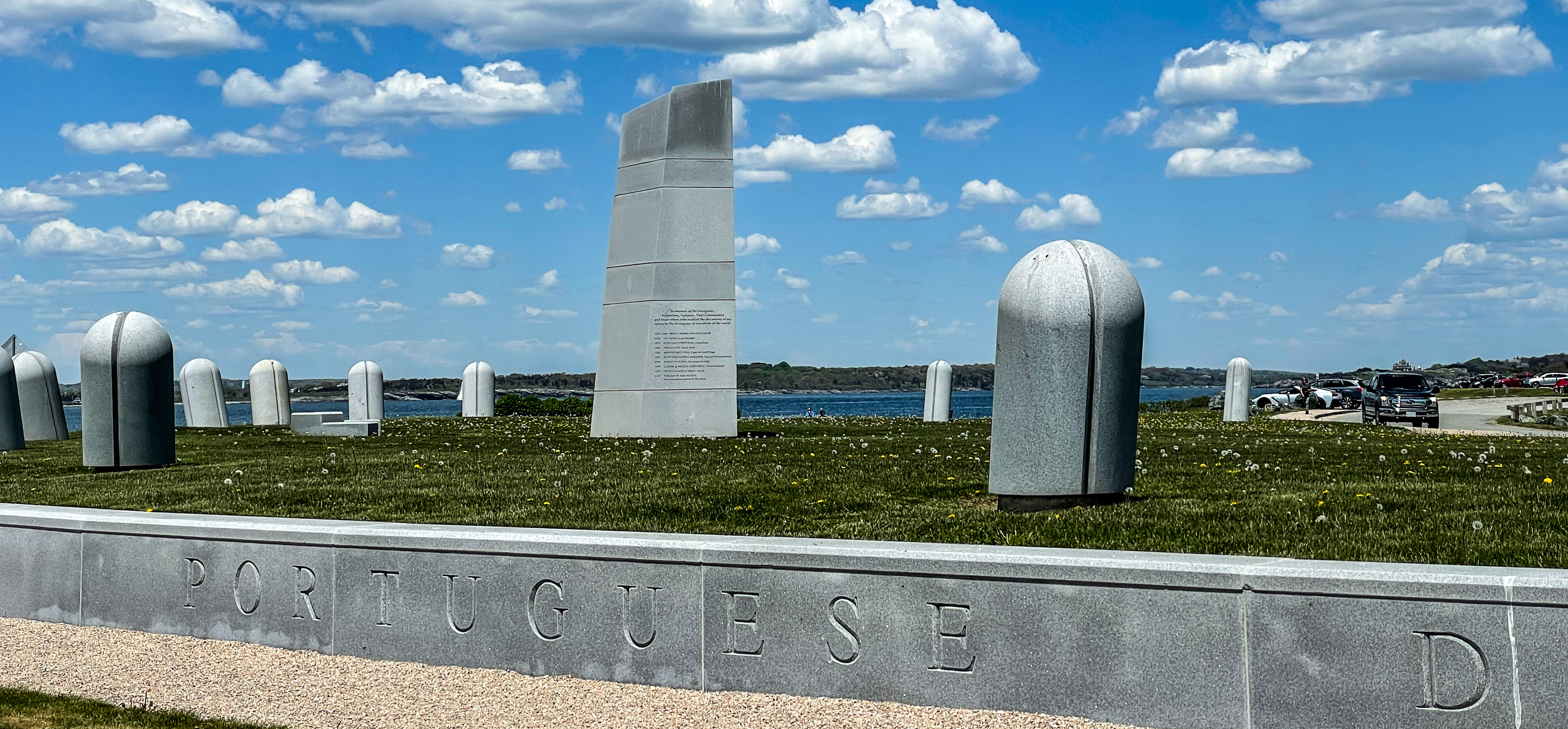
Portuguese Discovery Monument at Brenton Point State Park

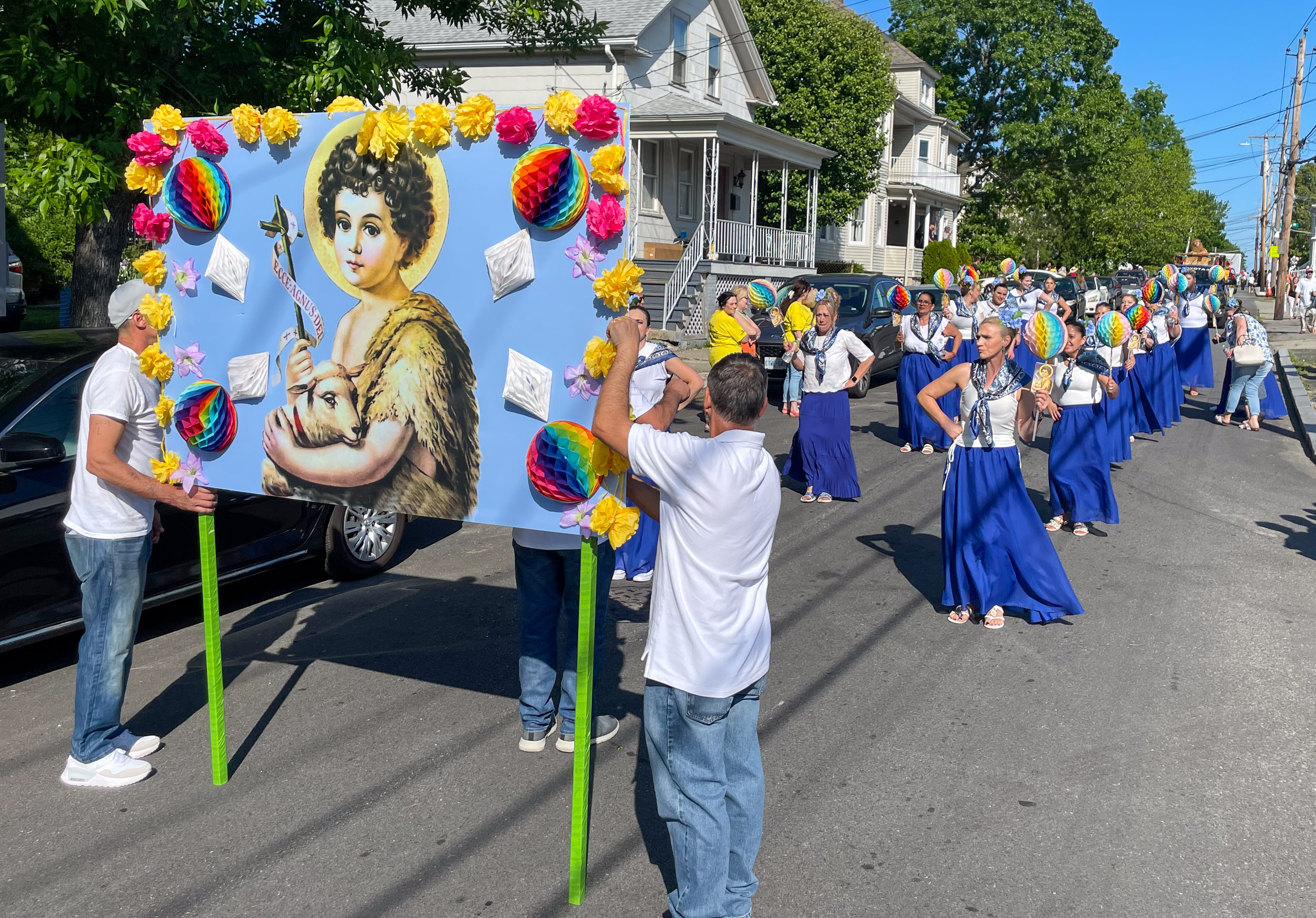
Bodo de Leite in East Providence

Top Cities by Country of Ancestry:

1. Fall River, Massachusetts: 37,350
2. New Bedford, Massachusetts: 30,390
3. New York City: 13,837
4. Taunton, Massachusetts: 13,825
5. East Providence, Rhode Island: 13,295
6. Dartmouth, Massachusetts: 12,907
7. San Jose, California: 11,712
8. Newark, New Jersey: 9,764
9. San Diego: 9,307
10. Pawtucket, Rhode Island: 7,077
11. Honolulu: 6,328
12. Sacramento, California: 6,007
13. Boston: 5,948
14. Turlock, California: 5,007
15. Tiverton, Rhode Island: 4,838
16. Elizabeth, New Jersey: 4,558
17. San Francisco: 4,518
18. Providence, Rhode Island: 4,486
19. Tulare, California: 4,046
20. Somerville, Massachusetts: 3,435
21. Kearny, New Jersey: 3,958
22. Philadelphia: 3,366
23. Las Vegas: 3,233
24. Hanford, California: 3,071

=== U.S. states with largest Portuguese populations ===
Portuguese in Massachusetts

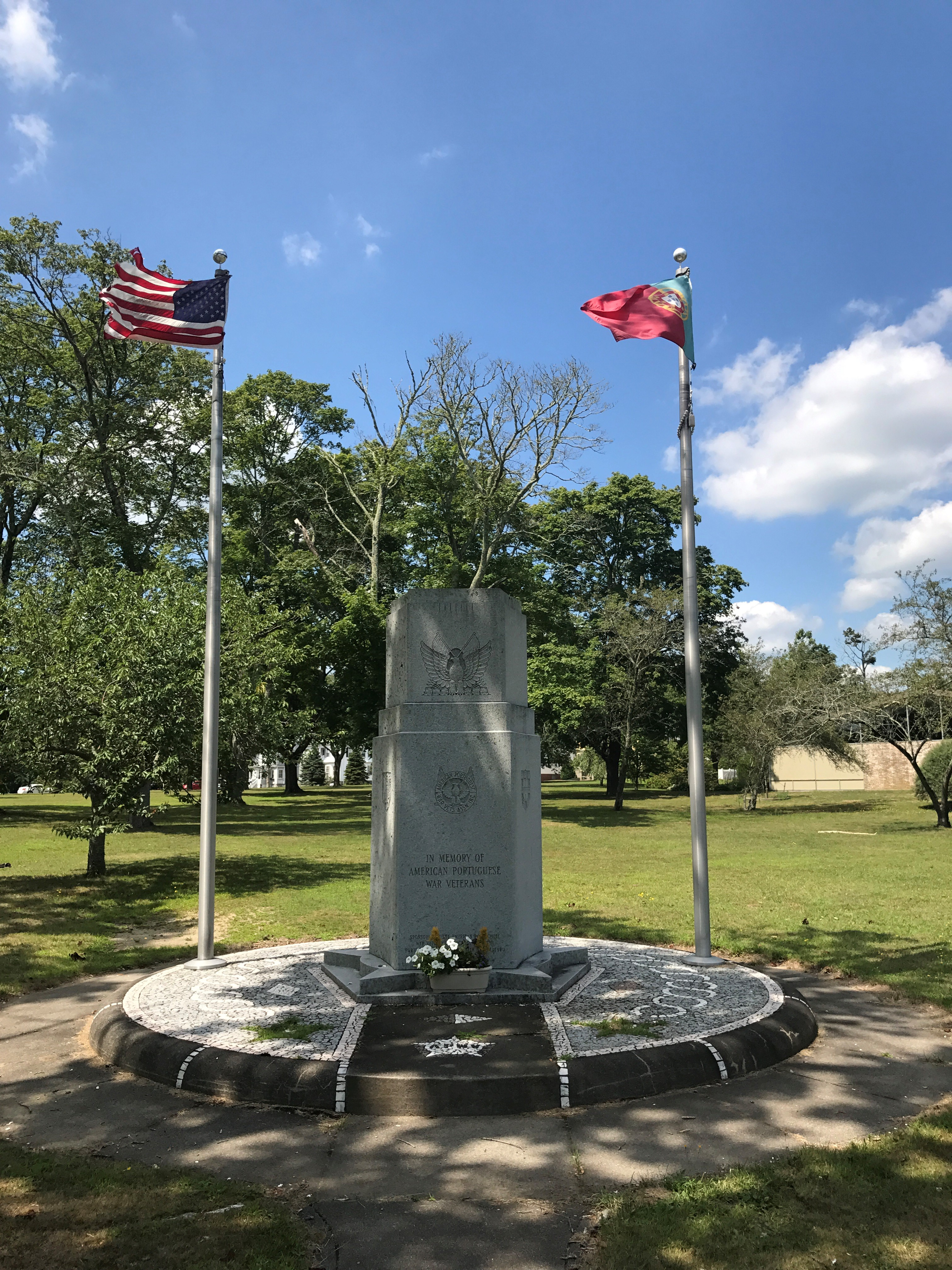
Portuguese-American Veterans Memorial in New Bedford

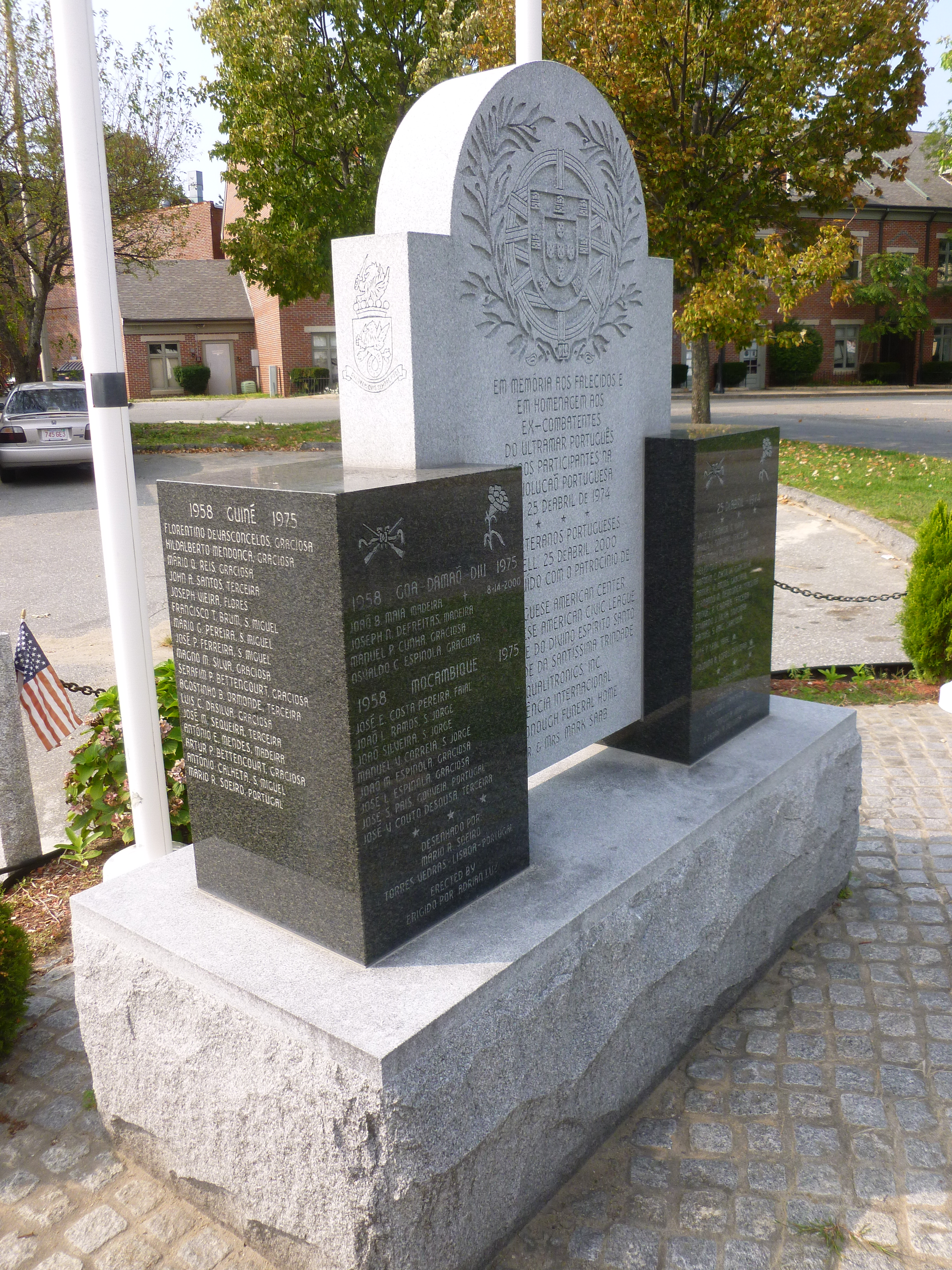
Portuguese Colonial War and Carnation Revolution memorial in Lowell

| State/Territory | Portuguese American Population (2020 count) | Percentage |
|---|---|---|
| Alabama | 3,428 | 0.07 |
| Alaska | 1,942 | 0.26 |
| Arizona | 19,999 | 0.28 |
| Arkansas | 2,289 | 0.08 |
| California | 350,077 | 0.89 |
| Colorado | 14,909 | 0.26 |
| Connecticut | 50,042 | 1.4 |
| Delaware | 1,956 | 0.2 |
| District of Columbia | 2,205 | 0.31 |
| Florida | 89,144 | 0.4 |
| (Georgia (U.S. state)) Georgia | 14,163 | 0.14 |
| Hawaii | 48,005 | 3.38 |
| Idaho | 8,288 | 0.47 |
| Illinois | 12,323 | 0.1 |
| Indiana | 4,309 | 0.06 |
| Iowa | 1,464 | 0.05 |
| Kansas | 2,727 | 0.09 |
| Kentucky | 2,613 | 0.06 |
| Louisiana | 3,863 | 0.08 |
| Maine | 7,611 | 0.57 |
| Maryland | 13,006 | 0.22 |
| Massachusetts | 265,355 | 3.86 |
| Michigan | 7,507 | 0.08 |
| Minnesota | 4,334 | 0.08 |
| Mississippi | 1,255 | 0.04 |
| Missouri | 5,628 | 0.09 |
| Montana | 2,273 | 0.21 |
| Nebraska | 1,479 | 0.08 |
| Nevada | 18,240 | 0.6 |
| New Hampshire | 19,601 | 1.45 |
| New Jersey | 82,951 | 0.93 |
| New Mexico | 4,246 | 0.2 |
| New York | 58,083 | 0.3 |
| North Carolina | 17,076 | 0.16 |
| North Dakota | 563 | 0.07 |
| Ohio | 9,470 | 0.08 |
| Oklahoma | 4,285 | 0.11 |
| Oregon | 21,984 | 0.53 |
| Pennsylvania | 23,569 | 0.18 |
| Rhode Island | 83,373 | 7.9 |
| South Carolina | 8,147 | 0.16 |
| South Dakota | 583 | 0.07 |
| Tennessee | 6,838 | 0.1 |
| Texas | 40,020 | 0.14 |
| Utah | 7,401 | 0.24 |
| Vermont | 2,731 | 0.44 |
| Virginia | 20,284 | 0.24 |
| Washington | 27,939 | 0.37 |
| West Virginia | 855 | 0.05 |
| Wisconsin | 4,246 | 0.07 |
| Wyoming | 900 | 0.16 |
| USA (2020) | 1,454,262 | 0.44 |

== See also ==
- Portugal–United States relations
- Portuguese immigration to Hawaii
- Portuguese Australians
- Portuguese Canadians
- Portuguese Brazilians
- Portuguese in the United Kingdom
- Portuguese New Zealanders
- Portuguese Argentine
