= CAPLE =

Portuguese language proficiency test

The Centro de Avaliação de Português Língua Estrangeira (CAPLE), or Centre for Evaluation of Portuguese as a Foreign Language, issues certifications of proficiency in standard European Portuguese as a second language. CAPLE exams are offered in Portugal and 45 other countries and territories. The official CAPLE examinations and certificates/diplomas are developed, delivered, and accredited by a tri-partite collaboration in Portugal between the School of Arts and Humanities at the University of Lisbon and the Instituto Camões, which administers the examination procedures on behalf of the Portuguese Ministry of Foreign Affairs.

== Eligibility ==
To be eligible for CAPLE certification, applicants must be at least 14 years of age, be a national of a country where Portuguese is not an official language, or, if they are from a country whose official language is Portuguese, they must meet two of the following conditions:

- Their parents' first language is not Portuguese.
- Their first language acquired was not Portuguese.
- Their main language of communication is not Portuguese.
- All or part of their basic or secondary education was not in Portuguese.

== Levels ==
CAPLE exams take place in May, July, and November in all testing centres, in addition to February, March, August, September, and October in Lisbon only. CAPLE exams are offered at six levels; however, there are a few places that may not offer the ACESSO level.

CEFL level	CAPLE exam	Summaries of Linguistic Competence
C2	DUPLE – Diploma universitário de português língua estrangeira	It certifies that the learner is capable of using the language in a creative and flexible way, adequately interacting in both predictable and unpredictable situations, namely in contexts where Portuguese is both the language of communication and the language used at work and education. The learner is capable of, for example, attending a university course in Portuguese or working in a country where Portuguese is the official language.
C1	DAPLE – Diploma avançado de português língua estrangeira	It certifies that the speaker is capable of interacting in a varied range of less predictable communicative situations in contexts where, for example, Portuguese is simultaneously the language of everyday communication, the language used at work and the language used in teaching. Some difficulties may still occur when the language is used idiomatically or contains cultural references.
B2	DIPLE – Diploma intermédio de português língua estrangeira	It certifies that the learner is capable of interacting in a number of everyday work and study communicative situations that require mostly a predictable use of the language. This level allows the speaker to work in contexts where Portuguese is the language of work. In the context where Portuguese is simultaneously the language of work and the language of communication the speaker may still experience many difficulties. A certified DIPLE speaker may attend academic courses in contexts where Portuguese is the language of teaching.
B1	DEPLE – Diploma elementar de português língua estrangeira	It certifies that the speaker is capable of interacting in a limited range of predictable everyday communicative situations in private, professional, and educational contexts.
A2	CIPLE – Certificado inicial de português língua estrangeira	It certifies that the speaker is capable of interacting in a limited range of everyday communicative situations. In the professional and academic domains, the users are capable of interacting in situations that require a limited level of proficiency in Portuguese.
A1	ACESSO – Certificado acesso ao português	It certifies that the speaker is capable of interacting in a very limited range of everyday communicative situations and satisfying the most basic needs of communication in private, public and professional domains.

== Test format ==
There are four parts of evaluation in every level that tests all four major language abilities – reading, writing, listening, and speaking. There is also an additional part called "Competência Estrutural" that appears on only the DIPLE, DAPLE, and DUPLE tests. The weight and amount of time allocated for each section varies by level.

Language ability	Required tasks
Compreensão da Leitura (Reading Comprehension)	In this part, candidates are required to read and understand the written information given and answer questions based on what they have read.
Produção e Interação Escritas (Written Production and Interaction)	In this part, candidates are required to fill out forms and enter personal information, and write out understandable and clear informational texts on matters related to private domains, such as private letters or notes.
Competência Estrutural (Structural Competence)	In this part, candidates are required to fill in blanks with appropriate words or re-organize text in various ways, and also transform any sentences that need changes.
Compreensão Oral (Oral Comprehension)	In this part, candidates are required to listen to and understand simple interactions or conversations on various matters related to public and private concerns and answer questions based on what they have heard.
Produção e Interação Orais (Oral Production and Interaction)	In this part, candidates are required to take part in simple, brief communicative conversation, speaking on matters related to professional, public, and private events or concerns. Candidates may interact with the examiner, other candidates, and/or both.

== Scoring ==
The minimum passing mark to receive the certificate or diploma for any test is 55%. Four categories of results dictate how well a candidate does.

Result	Mark range
Muito Bom (Very Good)	85% – 100%
Bom (Good)	70% – 84%
Suficiente (Sufficient)	55% – 69%
Insuficiente (Insufficient / Fail)	0% – 54%

== Recognition ==
CAPLE certificates/diplomas do not expire over time and are recognized across Portugal by various national and international institutions for the benefit of foreigners looking to:

- study and gain admission to Portuguese universities;
- find work and pursue a professional or academic career in Portugal; and
- obtain Portuguese nationality or permanent residency status (the A2/CIPLE level can be used to satisfy the requirement of having "basic Portuguese" skills).

== See also ==
- CELPE-Bras – Exam of Brazilian Portuguese for Foreigners developed by the Brazilian Ministry of Education
- TELC – The European Language Certificates (Portuguese available at Level B1 only)
