= Portuguese language in the Americas =

Most spoken language of South America

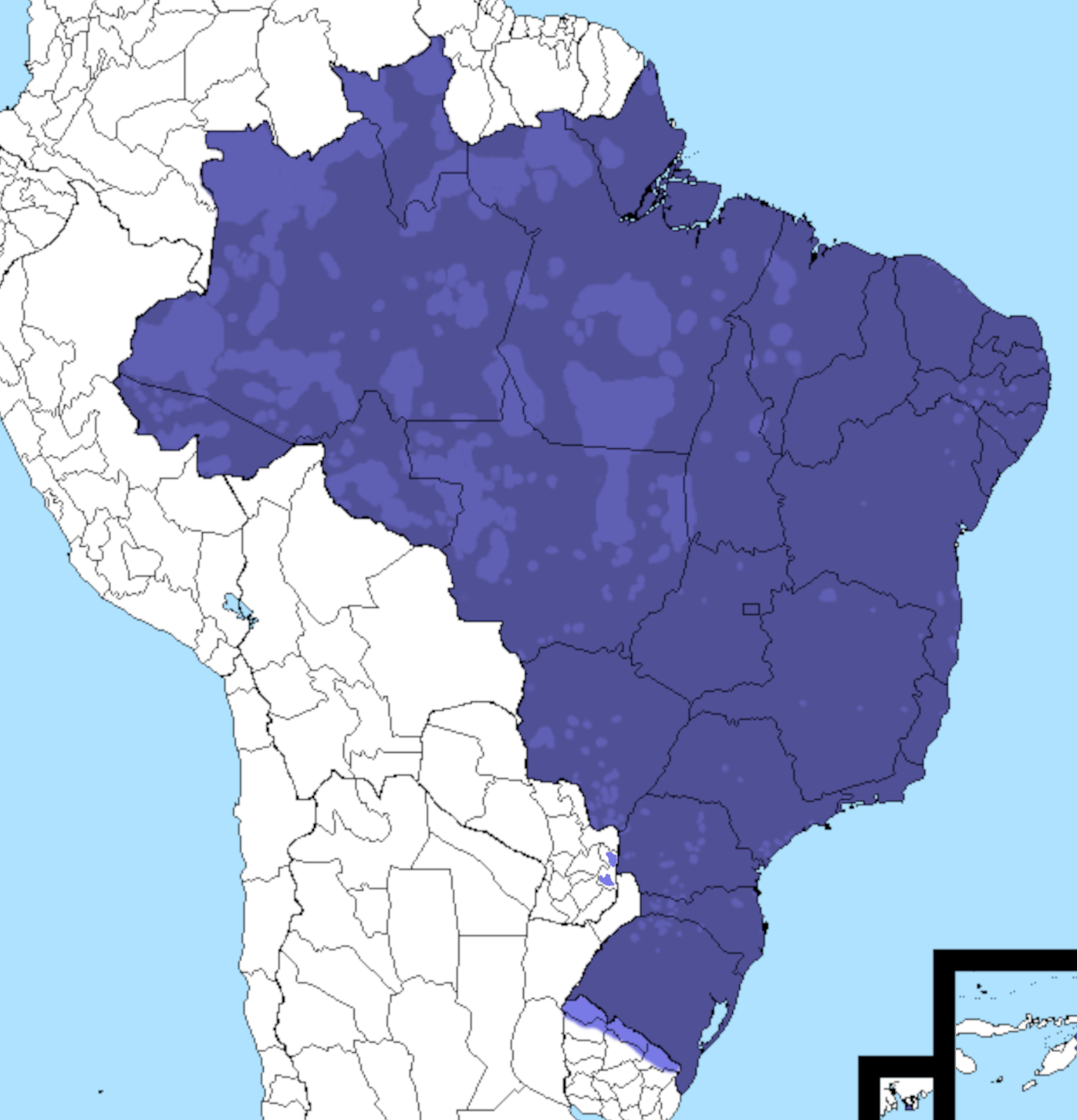
Map of Portuguese language usage in South America, including Brazil and Uruguay.

Portuguese is the third most spoken language of the Americas, and the most spoken language in South America. It is the sole official language of Brazil and is a co-official language of several regional organizations, notably Mercosul, UNASUL, ACTO, CELAC, the Rio Group, and ALADI.

The main varieties of Portuguese spoken in South America are Brazilian Portuguese (spoken by the vast majority), Uruguayan Portuguese and a mixed variety known as Portuñol/Portunhol.

== Geographic distribution ==
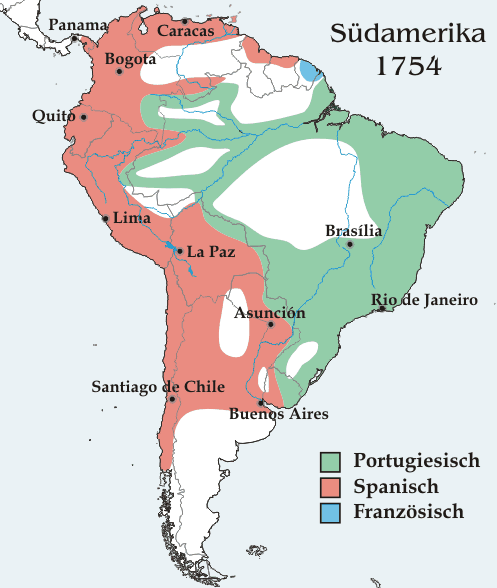
Portuguese control of South America in 1754. (Green)

Brazil is the largest country in which Portuguese is spoken in all of the Americas, with a population of approximately 220 million people, almost all of whom are native speakers of Portuguese. The size of this population renders Portuguese an important regional and world language. Research in regional and social variation in the Brazilian dialects of Portuguese, known together as Brazilian Portuguese, reveals the diversity of this language. The country also received settlers from Portugal and white settlers from former Portuguese African colonies, Eurasian settlers from Macau and East Timor.

Argentina was the first Spanish-speaking member state of Mercosur to participate in the Frontier schools project. It involves the exchange of language teachers with Brazil. Secondary schools are now required to offer Portuguese as a foreign language. The same goes for primary schools in provinces bordering Brazil.

Uruguay, born out of conflict first between the Spanish and Portuguese empires and then Brazil and Argentina, has Portuguese speakers in its northern region (see Portuñol). The acronym DPU (Dialectos Portugueses del Uruguay) is used to describe the varieties of Portuguese spoken in this region. DPU is not standardized and so Brazilian Portuguese serves as the primary model for Uruguayan speakers of Portuguese, native and non-native speakers alike. Instruction in Portuguese has now been increased in the Uruguayan education system. In the northern departments bordering Brazil, education has become bilingual combining Spanish and Portuguese as languages of instruction.

Paraguay has been receiving waves of Brazilian immigrants for decades, known as Brasiguaios. Unlike in Uruguay, the Brasigaios are a result of more recent immigration and, as such, are more markedly Brazilian in speech and cultural identity. These immigrants tend to settle in the eastern regions of the country and most originate from the Brazilian state of Paraná. Estimates of the size of this community range from 200,000 to 500,000.

Venezuela has a large and prominent Portuguese immigrant community, one of the largest in northern South America. Its membership in MERCOSUR is pending and, towards that end, the Venezuelan government has begun to encourage the teaching of Portuguese as a second language. Portuguese is to be made available in the public school system.

== The importance of Brazilian Portuguese ==
In South America, Brazilian Portuguese is the standard form of Portuguese for learners and non-native speakers. P.l.e. (Português como língua estrangeira) is the acronym used to describe the learning and instruction of Portuguese as a second or foreign language; a term comparable to ESL. Brazil's growing international profile and the adoption of Portuguese as an official language of Mercosur have created a demand for non-native fluency in Portuguese in the Hispanic member states. This has accompanied a growth in the private language instruction in Portuguese in said countries.

The Museum of the Portuguese language (the second language museum in the world) is located in São Paulo, Brazil.

The Brazilian Ministry of education has developed a proficiency test in Portuguese specifically for Brazil and based on the Brazilian norm: CELPE-Bras

The latest orthographic agreement was ratified first by Brazil and while it requires adjustments in spelling, hyphenation and accentuation from all CPLP member states, the agreement favours the Brazilian norm.

== Media and popular culture ==
Portuguese-speaking communities in South America outside of Brazil form the primary audience for Brazilian and Portuguese satellite television in their respective countries. Such programming be it football matches, telenovelas or variety shows allow lusophones outside of Brazil to access media and cultural content in Portuguese and stay informed and connected to events in Brazil. Rede Globo and RTPi are available throughout all of the Americas.

== See also ==
- Brazilian Portuguese
- Angolan Americans
- Portuguese Canadians
- Papiamento
- Cape Verdean Argentine
- CELPE-Bras
- MERCOSUL
- Treaty of El Pardo (1778)
- History of the Lusophone Americans in Newark, New Jersey
- Portuguesa (state)
- Portuguese Americans
- Uruguayan Portuguese
- Lusophone
- Portuguese colonization of the Americas
