= CELPE-Bras =

Portuguese language tests

CELPE-Bras (Portuguese: Certificado de Proficiência em Língua Portuguesa para Estrangeiros, "Certificate of Proficiency in Portuguese for Foreigners") is the only certificate of proficiency in Brazilian Portuguese as a second language officially recognized and developed by the Brazilian Ministry of Education. The Celpe-Bras exam is offered in Brazil and many other countries, such as the United States, Germany, Chile, Colombia and Japan, with the support of the Brazilian Ministry of International Relations.

The exam is taken by learners of Portuguese who wish to gauge their progress or who wish to provide proof of their level of proficiency, such as students planning to study at a higher-education institution in Brazil, and professionals who wish to have an academic certificate from their own country validated in Brazil or who need to register with professional bodies such as the Brazilian Federal Council of Medicine. The exam's certificate is also one of the documents that immigrants may use to attest their Portuguese language ability when applying for naturalization in Brazil.

== Levels ==
All candidates take the same exam, and are subsequently classified as having attained one of four levels of proficiency: intermediate, upper intermediate, advanced, or highly advanced.

== Format ==
=== Writing ===
3 hours Task 1 and 2 – Tasks integrate oral comprehension (video and audio) and written production. Tasks 3 and 4 – Tasks integrate reading and writing. The different parts of the writing component take place consecutively in one sitting, with no breaks.

=== Oral ===
20 minutes The oral component takes the form of a face-to-face conversation with an examiner, which is audio recorded.

Part 1 (5 minutes). The examiner asks the candidate questions about a range of familiar topics – their home, family, work, studies, interests, etc. The questions will be based on the questionnaire the candidate completed when registering for the exam.

Part 2 (15 minutes). Candidates are given a short text. They have one minute to read it before engaging in a conversation about it with the examiner, answering various questions. This is repeated with two further texts, making three in total. The speaking component will take place up to two days after the writing component. The test centre will advise.

== Assessment ==
Written component: The candidates' comprehension of the audio/video recordings and text will be assessed through their written answers.

The examiners assess: 1. Discourse adequacy: is the text in the appropriate genre? Is its purpose clear? Is the information appropriate? 2. Textual adequacy: is the text clear? Is it coherent? Is the register appropriate?

Oral component The candidates’ spoken Portuguese – and their understanding of spoken questions – will be tested. Particular attention will be paid to their interactional competence, fluency, lexical and grammar adequacy and pronunciation.

== Timing ==
The exam is held twice a year, usually in April and October. The registration periods are usually in February–March and August–September.

== Registration ==
Registration for the test is conducted online, for a fee, at the website of local Celpe-bras test centers. The writing component takes place on a Tuesday morning. The speaking component takes place on the Tuesday afternoon or on the Wednesday or Thursday.

Identification is required, and the results will be available online, within three months of the exam.

== See also ==
- CAPLE - certificate of proficiency in European Portuguese
