= Porglish =

Hybrid language

- Language family: Mixed Portuguese–English
- Writing system: Latin

Language codes
- ISO 639-3: –

Porglish or Portuglish (referred to in Portuguese as portinglês – Brazilian: [pɔʁtʃĩˈɡles], European: [puɾtĩˈɡleʃ] – or portunglês – pt-BR: [poʁtũˈɡles], pt-PT: [puɾtũˈɡleʃ]) is the various types of language contact between Portuguese and English which have occurred in regions where the two languages coexist. These range from improvised macaronic admixture of and code-switching between the languages by bilingual and partially bilingual users, to more-or-less stable patterns of usage.

The words are a blend of Portuguese and English. The earliest is Portuglish first recorded in 1997, followed by Portinglish (2001), Portlish (2005), Pinglish (2004) and Porglish (2006). The Portuguese term is a portmanteau of the Portuguese words português and inglês.

Porglish is rare but observable in Macau and other Portuguese-speaking regions in Asia and Oceania, among English-speaking expatriates and tourists in Portugal and Brazil, and Portuguese speakers in countries of the English-speaking world, primarily in North America and Oceania, but also Africa, South America, Caribbean and Asia. The best-studied example of this is spoken in the Portuguese communities in California, in Hawaii (pidgin contributions) and in the region between Fall River and New Bedford in Southeastern Massachusetts.

== As code-switching ==
It is the name often given to any unsystematic mixture of Portuguese with English (code-switching). This is sometimes used by speakers of the two languages to talk to each other.

Portuglish is similar to Spanglish, and it is basically composed of combined English and Portuguese lexicon and a Portuguese grammar.

== Examples ==
=== Among Brazilian Americans and others ===
Many of these examples can also apply to other Lusophone diasporas as Portuguese speakers raised in an English-speaking environment, and English speakers learning Portuguese, or any otherwise native speakers of one language used to the other.

Note: Those with ** are generally accepted in colloquial Brazilian Portuguese as this language variety is more open to receive loanwords than its European standard counterpart. Deletar, escanear and resetar are even very unlikely to be deemed as unacceptable words in the standard norm of Brazil as much more recently used bullying, instead of pre-existing Portuguese words as bulimento (bullying), bulir (to bully) and bulidor (bully), has been promoted from slang and now it is accepted in the variety's educated norm, to the dismay of some language purists.

- Aplicação – application (instead of Port. formulário)
- Apontamento – appointment (instead of Port. horário, encontro)
- Attachar or atachar – to attach (instead of Port. anexar)
- Bizado or bisado – busy (instead of Port. ocupado)
- Bootar or butar – to boot, usually computers (instead of Port. iniciar)
- Chattear – to chat (instead of Port. conversar, bater papo – the Portuguese homophone chatear has the meaning of to annoy, to pester someone)
- Dar um suit – to sue (instead of Port. processar)
- Deletar** – to delete (instead of Port. excluir, apagar, suprimir, delir – while originally a Latin word as deletare, its popularity revived together with the adoption of the English usage)
- Dropar – to drop (instead of Port. derrubar, descartar, descer, largar)
- Escanear** or scanear** – to scan (instead of Port. digitalizar, varrer, ler, examinar)
- Escore – score (instead of Port. pontuação)
- Espreiar or spreiar – to spray (instead of Port. pulverizar, borrifar)
- Eslaidar or slidar – to slide (instead of Port. escorregar, deslizar, resvalar)
- Estartar or startar – to start (instead of Port. iniciar, inicializar)
- Frizar or frisar – to freeze (instead of Port. congelar – the correct use of frisar has the meaning of to emphasize; so it can be the correct Portuguese usage depending on context)
- Hoovar – to vacuum, to hoover (UK) (instead of Port. aspirar o pó, passar o aspirador de pó)
- Inicializar** – to initialize (instead of Port. iniciar)
- Mopear – to mop (UK) (instead of Port. esfregar, usar o esfregão)
- Ordenar – to place an order (instead of Port. encomendar, pedir, fazer um pedido, requisitar – the correct use of ordenar has the meaning of to command, to ordain; so it can be the correct Portuguese usage depending on context)
- Parkear or parquear – to park (instead of Port. estacionar)
- Performar - to perform (instead of Port. desempenhar, realizar)
- Plotar – to plot (instead of Port. traçar, imprimir mapa ou gráfico)
- Printar – to print out (instead of Port. imprimir); also: to make a screen capture (derived from the computer key "Print Screen")
- Realizar – to realize/realise (instead of Port. perceber, compreender – the correct use of realizar has the meaning of perform, accomplish, achieve; so it can be the correct Portuguese usage depending on context)
- Resetar** – to reset (instead of Port. reiniciar, reinicializar)
- Ser suposto a/estar suposto a** – to be supposed to (also Port. dever, dever de – while very rare and sounding odd to most Portuguese speakers, it is a correct Portuguese usage)
- Upar** or uppar – to up (on a level; slang term used for RPG games by Brazilian players, instead of Port. evoluir) or to upload (instead of rarely used Port. subir – the opposite of baixar, the literal translation of download)
- Vacuumar or vequiar – to vacuum (instead of Port. aspirar o pó, passar o aspirador de pó)

== See also ==
- Llanito
- English
- English dialects
- Portuguese dialects
- Code-switching
- Portuñol
- Franglais
- Spanglish
- English As She Is Spoke
