= Timorese Americans =

Total population
- 67 (2020 census, alone); 163 (2020 census, in combination)

Languages
- American English • Tetum

Religion
- Catholicism

Related ethnic groups
- Southeast Asian Americans

Timorese Americans are Americans whose ethnic origins lie fully or partially in any part of Timor-Leste.

== Population ==
According to the United States Census Bureau, in 2020, there were 67 Timorese in the United States.

== Notable people ==
- Jen Shyu (born 1978), musician

== See also ==
- Southeast Asian Americans
