= Esmahan Aykol =

Turkish-born German novelist

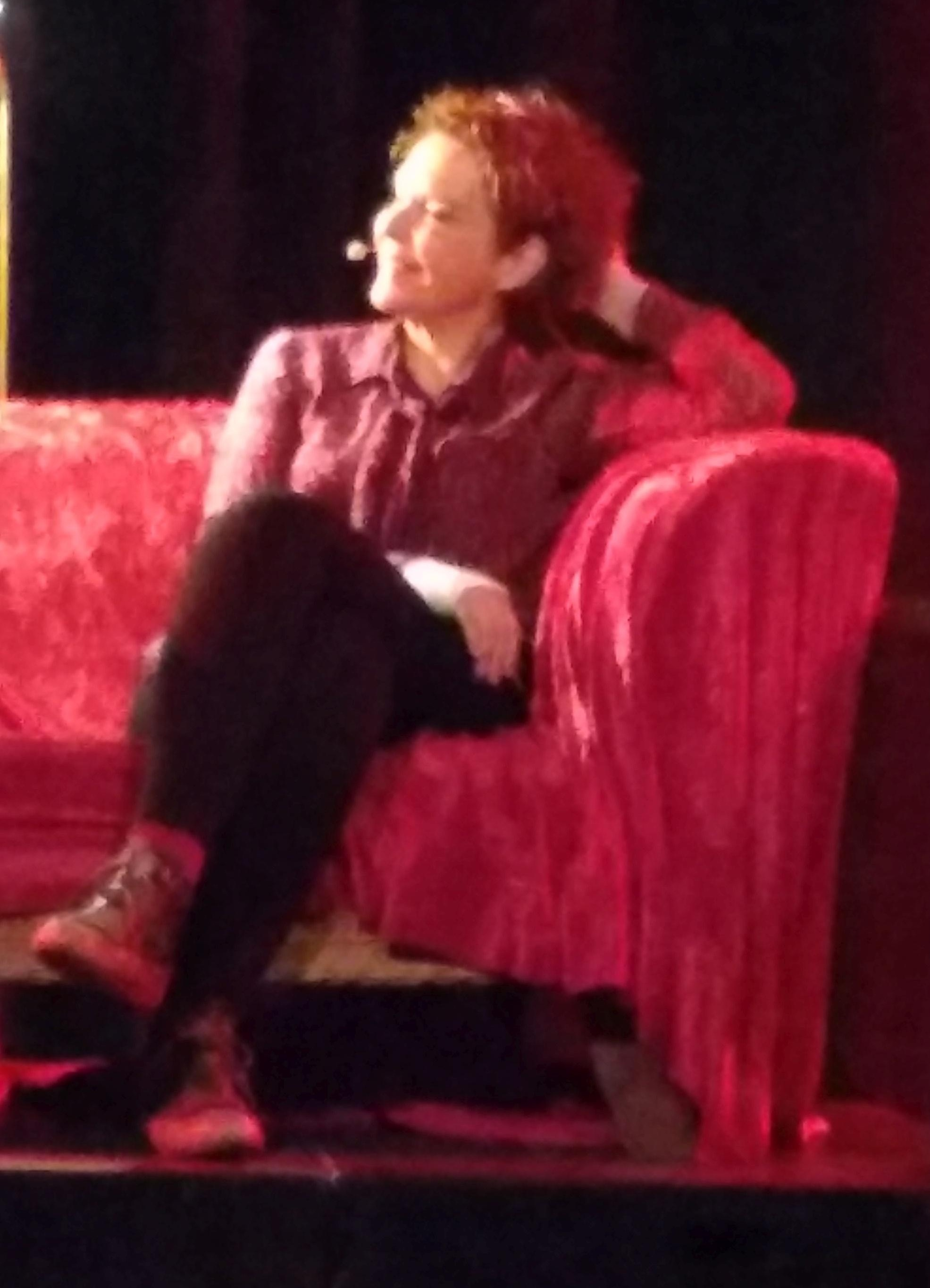
- Born: 1970 (age 55–56); Edirne
- Education: Istanbul University, Humboldt University of Berlin
- Writing career
- Genre: Mystery

Esmahan Aykol (born 1970) is a Turkish-born German novelist, best known for her detective novels featuring Kati Hirschel, an Istanbul bookseller of crime fiction.

== Biography ==
Esmahan Aykol was born in Edirne in 1970, into a Turkish family from the Balkans; her father is from Macedonia while her grandmother was from Bulgaria. Both her parents were lawyers. She attended a British boarding school in Istanbul, where German was taught as a second language.

Aykol received a degree in law from Istanbul University and a postgraduate degree in law from Humboldt University of Berlin, where her dissertation was on discrimination and differences between Turkish and German divorce law. During her studies in Istanbul, she wrote articles on social issues for Turkish cultural journals, including coverage of the city's street children. Following her degree in 1996, she opened a pub with a friend, but it was unsuccessful. She then moved to Berlin with her husband, where she began writing crime fiction in the Turkish language.

Aykol's first novel, Kitapçı Dükkani was published in 2001. It featured Kati Hirschel, the owner of Istanbul's only crime fiction bookstore, a woman of German origin, whose inquisitiveness and passion for crime novels leads her to investigate a murder. The book was a bestseller and was followed by sequels, including Kelepir Ev (2003), Şüpheli Bir Ölüm (2007), and Tango Istanbul (2012). As of 2015, three of these books have been translated into English.

In 2006, Aykol published Savrulanlar, about a woman named Ece who escapes to London after a failed love affair. The book is an ode to the ancient art of storytelling, which remains a tradition of great honour among the Kurdish and Armenian communities in Turkey. Ece, stuck in a foreign land, recalls the stories told by her grandfather, an Armenian jeweller, and his experiences during the events of 1915. For authenticity in her novel, Aykol trained at a goldsmith's shop in Kreuzberg, Berlin, as well as with an Armenian silversmith in Istanbul.

Aykol lives and works in Berlin and Istanbul. She has taken up German citizenship.

== Selected works ==
=== Crime fiction ===
- Kitapçı Dükkani. Istanbul: Everest. 2001. ISBN 9753169671.
- Kelepir Ev. Istanbul: Everest. 2003. ISBN 9752890717.
- Şüpheli Bir Ölüm. Istanbul: Turkuvaz. 2007. ISBN 978 9944860017.
- Tango İstanbul. Istanbul: Mephisto Kitaplığı. 2012. ISBN 978 6058749528.

=== Novels ===
- Savrulanlar. Istanbul: Turkuvaz. 2006. ISBN 9759174367.

=== In English translation ===
- Hotel Bosphorus. Translated by Whitehouse, Ruth. Bitter Lemon. 2011. ISBN 9781904738688.
- Baksheesh. Translated by Whitehouse, Ruth. Bitter Lemon. 2013. ISBN 9781908524041.
- Divorce Turkish Style. Translated by Whitehouse, Ruth. Bitter Lemon. 2015. ISBN 9781908524577.
