= International students in South Korea =

The International students in South Korea are students who are pursuing a degree or studying a language at a South Korean university. In April 2024, the number of international students studying at universities and colleges in South Korea was 208,962. The government announced its Study Korea 300K plan to attract 300,000 foreign students by 2027. In other words, it aims to become one of the top 10 destinations for studying abroad by student count by 2027.

== Statistics ==
Number of international students in South Korea
Year	Students
2005	22,526
2007	49,270
2009	75,850
2011	89,537
2013	85,923
2015	91,332
2017	123,858
2019	160,165
2020	153,695
2021	152,281
2023	181,842
2024	208,962

The International enrolments in South Korea have reached 207,125 as of June 2023. The number of international students in Korea is 181,842. In 2023, South Korean government announced its five-year plan to attract 300,000 international students. Its main content is to lift the Korean language reguirement for college admission, expand internship and employment opportunities, and establish a quick visa system.

As of 2024, the most common nationalities of international students were Asia, Europe, North America, Africa, and South America. Among the students, 69.8% were degree students, and 30.2% were non-degree students such as exchange students or language students. The number of students attending universities in the Seoul Metropolitan Area was 56% of the total.

== Program ==
The department of the National Institute For International Education under the Ministry of Education supports foreigners who came to study in South Korea.

The Korean government scholarship program is named Global Korea Scholarship (GKS) and includes seven programs, including a full scholarship program and a study tour program.

- Korean Government Support Program for Foreign Exchange Students

The exchange student support program provides financial support from the government to international exchange students selected from cooperative Universities in South Korea, and the period is four months.

- Korean Government Scholarship Program

The Korean Government Scholarship Program (KGSP) is an academic scholarship funded and managed by the National Institute for International Education (NIIED), a branch of the Ministry of Education in South Korea. This scholarship provides non-Korean scholars (or overseas Koreans who fulfil certain criteria) with the funding and opportunity to conduct undergraduate or postgraduate level studies in South Korea after completing one year of intensive Korean language studies. Since its conception in 1967, over 3,000 students from 148 countries have successfully completed the scholarship program.

== University ==
=== Seoul ===
Universities in Seoul (2024)
Rank	University
1	Seoul National University
2	Yonsei University
4	Sungkyunkwan University
7	Korea University
8	Kyung Hee University
9	Sejong University
10	Hanyang University

=== Daejon ===
Universities in Daejon (2023)
Rank	University
3	KAIST
11	UST
23	Chungnam National University
56	Daejon University
79	Hanbat National University
84	Hannam University
86	Woosong University

=== Korean language ===
University-level education includes:

- Yonsei University Korean Language Institute
- Myongji University Korean Language Institute
- Seoul National University Korean Language Education Center
- Sogang University Korean Language Education Center
- Busan University of Foreign Studies
- Language Education Institute of Pusan National University

== See also ==
- Education in South Korea
- Visa policy of South Korea
- Korean Government Scholarship Program
- Scholarships in Korea
- Korean language
- Korean as a foreign language
- KLAT
- TOPIK
