= Korean language education in India =

Korean language education in India includes learning at Indian colleges and universities, schools, and institutions.

In 2022, a total of 2,342 Indian students learned the Korean language. During this period, more of 20 schools conducted regular Korean language classes and 25 schools conducted Korean hobby classes. Since the revised National Education Policy of India introduced Korean as one of the elective subjects for a second language, the acceptance of Korean language classes in schools in India has been steadily increasing.

== Current status ==
As of April 2023, about 2,500 students enrolled in Korean language learning, including 21 regular classes and 17 hobby classes.

In general schools, Korean language classes are usually available for grades 6–8. However, students who have completed grade 8 cannot continue their Korean classes due to the local foreign language education policy.

For Indians aged 17 to 25, Korean ranked fifth on Duolingo's Most Popular Languages chart.

== See also ==
- Language learning
- King Sejong Institute
- Korean as a foreign language
