= Korean language education in Russia =

Korean language education in Russia includes learning at Russian colleges and universities, schools, and institutions.

As of 2018, Korean is the third most popular foreign language in Russia. Russia has the fourth largest number of university-level Korean language and Korean studies classes and programs.

== History ==
Russia was the first European country to teach the Korean language at the university level. In 1897, St. Petersburg State University established a Korean language program.

In the 2010s, the number of universities adding Korean language classes increased as interest in Korean increased due to the Korean Wave.

== Current status ==
According to the Korea Foundation statistics, Russia offers the world's fourth-largest number of Korean language classes.

Moscow University established a Korean language major in 2021. The university offers various courses such as 'Korean Teaching Method,' 'Culture of Korean Technological Development,' and 'Korean Geography.'

== See also ==
- Language learning
- King Sejong Institute
- Korean as a foreign language
