= Klec =

Klec, Kleç, Kleč or KLEC may refer to:

== Places ==
- Kleç, a mountain peak between Kosovo and North Macedonia
- Kleč, Kočevje, a settlement in Kočevje, Slovenia
- Kleč, Semič, a hamlet in Semič, Slovenia
- Klec (Jindřichův Hradec District), a municipality and village in the Czech Republic

== People ==
- Ivo Klec, Slovak tennis player

== Radio stations ==
- KLEC (FM), a radio station (90.5 FM) licensed to serve Liberal, Kansas, United States
- KOLL, a radio station (106.3 FM) licensed to serve Lonoke, Arkansas, United States, which held the call sign KLEC-FM from 2000 to 2004

== Other uses ==
- Korean Language Education Center (disambiguation)
