= Korean language education in the United States =

Korean language education in the United States includes learning at U.S. colleges and universities, schools, and institutions.

According to a study conducted by Live the Language School (LTL), an Asian language education institution, Korean language is the second most desired language by Americans with an average monthly Google search volume of more than 130,000. Korean language is one of the only three in the United States university foreign language enrollment rate to rise from 2016 to 2021. The number of Korean language learners increased from 13.9K in 2016 to 19.3K in 2021.

== History ==
The number of students studying Korean languages at colleges and universities in the United States was 26 in 1958, 182 in 1963, and 87 in 1974. During South Korea's economic development boom, the number surged from 365 to 2,375 between 1980 and 1990. In the 1990s, the number of learners exceeded 5,000. There were 8,449 Korean language learners at United States colleges and universities in 2009, 13,912 in 2016, and more of 20,000 in 2021.

== Current status ==
In 2018, the Korean American Center in Irvine, California was designated a King Sejong Institute by the South Korean government, becoming one of the few Sejong Institutes on the United States. It offers a full curriculum of Korean language classes for both youth and adults, as well as cultural programming and community outreach events.

According to a 2019 report by the Modern Language Society, Korean is the 11th most studied language in U.S. colleges.

Yeonhee Yoon, a Korean language and culture professor and the Korean language program coordinator at the University of Notre Dame, says:

“If people know the Korean language and culture, they can get a job in South Korea at a leading globalized company, such as Samsung, Hyundai or LG......They can also get government jobs in the United States because Korean is one of the United States’ strategic languages.”

== See also ==
- Language learning
- King Sejong Institute
- Korean as a foreign language
