= Yonsei University Korean Language Institute =

Educational institution

The Yonsei University Korean Language Institute (Korean: 한국어학당; Hanja: 韓國語學堂) provides instruction in Korean as a foreign language for international students and businesspeople in Seodaemun-gu, Seoul.

Established in 1959, over 62,000 students from more than 120 countries have studied at Yonsei KLI.

Most students have come from Japan (over 18,000), United States (over 16,000) or China (over 3,000).

== Program overview ==
Using a six-level series of books published in-house, the institute implements its instruction through its A or B course.

The A course moves at a quick pace and completes one book per semester term, while the B course is paced a bit slower. Usually, students native to other Asian countries or having some prior knowledge of the Korean language opt for the A course, while students coming from Western language backgrounds are encouraged to take the B course. The B course may not be offered if there are not enough students enrolled.

Level one starts with the most basic skills of reading and pronouncing the Korean alphabet and character combinations while providing a foundation of elementary grammar. Levels two and three build on these with increasingly complex sentence structures and vocabulary. Levels four through six are notably more intensive than the first three and deal with refining speaking and writing skills for everyday fluency, Korean university entrance, or professional application.

Each level consists of 10 weeks of instruction, totaling 200 classroom hours. If a student accumulates more than 40 hours of absences from class, he or she cannot move on to the next level without exception. Students are graded based on a midterm and final exam and must receive at least a 60 percent score in each subject (writing, reading, listening and speaking) to move on to the next level. If a student fails to achieve this score during the original testing period, retesting is available as long as he or she failed three or fewer subjects. If all four test scores are substandard, the student must repeat the level.

== Special activities ==
The school uses special contests each semester to aid in instruction. The first three levels include a speaking contest, Korean song contest, and stage play contest.

There are cultural activities for students to participate in ranging from cooking Korean foods or visiting museums to creating traditional items such as masks or fans.

== Housing ==
Housing is available on campus in the SK Global House and International House. It is next to the Korean Language Institute. KLI students are only guaranteed three semesters (9 months) of housing there, and living there in subsequent terms is subject to room availability. In the SK Global House, options are available between a single or shared room, both types of rooms come with attached bathrooms. In the International House, a room is shared between two students, and bathrooms are communal. Both the buildings are separated into male and female floors with barred entry for members of the opposite sex, however SK Global house allows members of the opposite sex to particular floors during specified timings. There are small television lounges on each floor, a study lounge with computers with internet access on the first floor, and a large lounge and laundry room in the basement level. Security is present in the buildings, and entry is permitted through the a key card, which is issued at the time of entry. The fee is approximately over 1,000,000 won per semester.

=== Private housing ===
Many students live in a student boarding house or hasukjib (Korean: 하숙집; Hanja: 下宿집). These places usually allow the student to live in a private room, and some meals are included. Typically, an older woman runs the house and provides breakfast and dinner. The quality and quantity of the food will vary based on price and owner, but this is the most popular housing option for Korean college students and most KLI students. Fees range from 300,000 to 600,000 won per month.

A goshiwon (Korean: 고시원; Hanja: 考試院) offers similar privacy to a hasukjib, but the facilities may not be as comfortable. Rooms tend to be small, but the prices are significantly cheaper than most hasukjib (150,000-400,000 South Korean won per month).

One-room (studio) apartments or multiple room apartments are available, but the prices are usually higher. It is common policy for landlords to ask for large deposits from foreign nationals wishing to live in a place they are renting out. Fees range greatly, but monthly rent typically starts at 400,000 won.

== Reputation ==
The Yonsei program is one of the three Korean language programs approved by the Blakemore Foundation for its advanced study grants, the others being the Korean Language Education Centers at Sogang University and Seoul National University.

== Controversies ==
As of May 2022, the newly formed Teachers Union of Yonsei KLI has begun publicly protesting against the institute administration's expectation of free labor. Students have generally voiced solidarity with the union protests, which are ongoing.

== See also ==
- Language learning
- King Sejong Institute
- Korean as a foreign language
- Myongji University Korean Language Institute
- Seoul National University Korean Language Education Center
- Sogang University Korean Language Education Center
- Busan University of Foreign Studies
