= Korean American Center =

- Native Name: 미주한미교육재단
- Founded: 2015 (origins in 2013)
- Headquarters: Irvine, CA
- Areas Served: United States
- Focus: Korean language education, cultural education, and community services
- Accreditation: Western Association of Schools and Colleges (2025)
- Affiliation: King Sejong Institute network
- Website: https://koreanamericancenter.org/

Korean American Center, established in 2015, is a nonprofit educational and community organization based in Irvine, California. The organization provides Korean language instruction, cultural education, and community programs for Korean Americans and the general public.

Its language programs serve both heritage and non-heritage learners through in-person instruction in Southern California and live online instruction nationwide. The organization has been featured in English- and Korean-language news coverage, including reports by The New York Times, Los Angeles Times, and NBC News.

== History ==
Korean American Center traces its origins to 2013, when a group in Orange County, California, began holding informal weekly gatherings and Korean-English language exchanges. Initially known as the Orange County Korean American Cultural Exchange, the group focused on Korean language and cultural education for second and third generation Korean Americans as well as cultural exchange with the broader community.

The organization was formally established as a 501(c)(3) nonprofit organization in 2015, based in Irvine, California.

It's activities have included youth leadership and civic engagement programs, as well as community support, resource navigation, and referral services for low income, older adults and immigrant members of the Korean American community.

In 2018, KAC finalized a merger with Korean Community Services (KCS), an Orange County nonprofit providing health and social services. Following the merger, KAC operated as a division of KCS while continuing its Korean language and cultural programs.

That year, KAC was selected to operate the Irvine King Sejong Institute, joining an international network supported by South Korea Ministry of Culture, Sports and Tourism. NBC News reported that existing student demand and strong reviews were factors into the selection.

Also in 2018, KAC received funding through STARTALK, a federally funded initiative supported by the National Security Agency to expand instruction in critical-need languages. In partnership with the University of California, Irvine's Center for Critical Korean Studies, KAC established a summer Korean language program for heritage learners. KAC continued operating STARTALK programs through 2023.

In 2023 KCS separated its Korean American Center division, and KAC resumed operations as an independent nonprofit organization.

== Recognition and accreditation ==
In 2023, Irvine King Sejong Institute, operated by Korean American Center, received an Outstanding King Sejong Institute Award from the King Sejong Institute Foundation at the World Korean Language Educators Conference in Seoul. The Institute also received an award in the Foundation's competition for exemplary cultural programming.

In 2025, Korean American Center received accreditation from the Accrediting Commission for Schools - Western Association of Schools and Colleges (ACS WASC).

== Also See ==
- King Sejong Institute
- Korean Language Education in the United States
- STARTALK (Language Program)
- Western Association of Schools and Colleges (WASC)
