= Korean Language Institute =

Korean Language Institute may refer to:

- Yonsei University Korean Language Institute, University department
- National Institute of Korean Language (국립국어원), South Korean language regulator
- Korean Language Society (한글 학회)
- Korean Language Institute (1907) (국문 연구소)
