= Myongji University Korean Language Institute =

Educational institution in Seoul, South Korea

Coordinates: 37°34′51″N 126°55′26″E

- Type: Private
- Established: 2011
- President: Kim Yong-tae
- Location: 34 Gebukgol Road, Seodaemun-gu, Seoul 120-728, Seoul, South Korea

The Myongji University Korean Language Institute (Korean: 한국어학당; Hanja: 韓國語學堂) is an institute in Seoul, South Korea which offers Korean as a foreign language courses. It was established in 2008 and has been providing language education for South Korean government scholarship students. Currently there are 500 students from over 19 different countries.

== Overview ==
The academic year consists of 4 semesters (Spring, Summer, Fall, Winter) offered in 5 levels. There are classes 5 days a week (Monday to Friday), 4 hours a day.

== Events and activities ==
1. The orientation provides general introduction of the institute and life in South Korea.
2. Once a semester, a variety of events are offered for experiencing Korean culture and Korean history.
3. Certification Ceremony for Outstanding Academic Performance and Attendance.

== See also ==
- Language learning
- King Sejong Institute
- Korean as a foreign language
- Yonsei University Korean Language Institute
- Seoul National University Korean Language Education Center
- Sogang University Korean Language Education Center
- Busan University of Foreign Studies

== See also ==
- Language Education Institute
