= WINLAB =

WINLAB, WIN-LAB or Wireless Information Networking Laboratory can refer to:

- WINLAB (Rutgers University), at Rutgers University in the United States
- WINLAB (Yeungnam University), at Yeungnam University in South Korea
