= KGSP =

KGSP may refer to:

- King Abdullah University of Science and Technology Gifted Student Program
- KGSP (FM)
- Greenville–Spartanburg International Airport
- Korean Government Scholarship Program
