= Keimyung University Korean Language Institute =

Korean language program

Coordinates: 35°51′28″N 128°29′7″E

Keimying University Korean Language Institute
- Type: Private
- President: Synn Ilhi
- Location: 2800, Dalgubeoldaero, Dalseogu, Daegu, Korea., Daegu, Daegu, South Korea
- Website: http://web.kmu.ac.kr/eintlcenter/

Korean Language Institute (Korean: 한국어학당; Hanja: 韓國語學堂) offered by Keimyung University, is located in Daegu of 2.5 million people and one of Korea’s top three cities. (Korean Language and Cultural Center(KLCC)) provides a comprehensive Korean education program for students from different countries. The overall goal of this program is to help the students foster a better understanding of the Korean spirit, heritage and Korean history. The campus is two hours by metro from downtown Seoul.

The Korean Language Institute at Keimyung University is one of the designated language institutes for Korean Government Scholarship Program students.

== Overview of the Program ==
=== Students are placed for each level through tests and interviews ===
- Various levels: Beginning IㆍII, Intermediate IㆍII, Advanced IㆍII
- Synthetic educational system: reading, listening, speaking and writing
- Average class size: 10 students, no more than 15 in each class
- Classes lasts 4 hours a day, 5 days a week (Mon - Fri), 10weeks (200 hours)

== Facilities ==
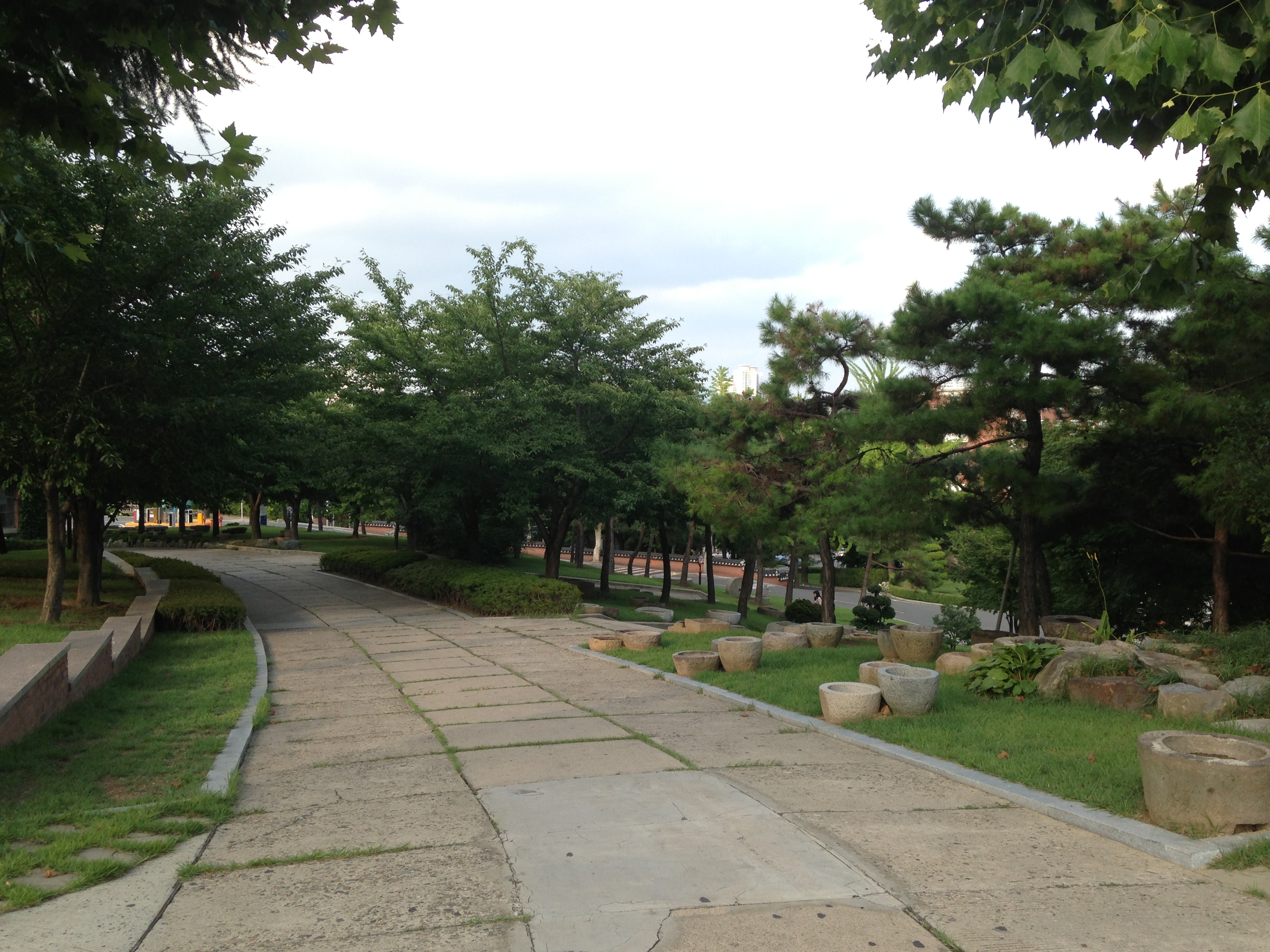
Keimyung University

=== Classroom and International Lounge ===
- Each class is equipped with multi computers
- Comfortable lounges for students from outside Korea

=== Dormitories ===
- Shared double room, dining room, computer room, conference room.
- Breakfast and supper on weekdays (Mon - Fri), breakfast, lunch and supper on weekends.
