= Startalk =

Startalk or StarTalk may refer to:

- StarTalk (podcast), a science-themed podcast hosted by American astrophysicist Neil deGrasse Tyson
- StarTalk (American talk show), an American television talk show hosted by Neil deGrasse Tyson, a spin-off of the podcast of the same name, which airs on National Geographic Channel
- Startalk (Philippine talk show), an entertainment news and talk show
- STARTALK (language program), an educational program of the University of Maryland
