= Korean Language Education Center =

Korean Language Education Center may refer to:

- Seoul National University Korean Language Education Center
- Sogang University Korean Language Education Center
