= Institute for Mediterranean Studies =

South Korean research institute

The Institute for Mediterranean Studies (IMS) (부산외국어대학교 지중해지역원) is an interdisciplinary institute that promotes, facilitates and publishes research in the field of Mediterranean Studies in South Korea. The IMS provides a center for holistic research and analysis of the Mediterranean Area, as well as academic teaching on the region. The IMS’s objectives are: fostering the establishment of Mediterranean Studies in the European and Middle-Eastern Research Areas, publishing scholarly literature on the Mediterranean, and establishing collaborative networks of researchers, academics and Mediterranean organizations across the world by organizing international conferences, seminars and ongoing global collaborations. With the beginning of the Humanities Korea (HK) project from 2007 to 2017 and Humanities Korea Plus(HK+) from 2018 to 2025, IMS has concentrated on research with ICT experts in order for cultivation of advanced academic achievement in integrative field.

== History ==
While the area studies known as “Mediterranean Studies” have been established in France, Spain and the United Kingdom since the 1990s, the Mediterranean area has largely been regarded in Korea as a place for tourism rather than an academic subject. Furthermore, while there are many research institutes and university departments in Korea working on Europe, North Africa and the Middle East, an Institute considering the entire Mediterranean region has been missing, creating a need to inaugurate a tradition of studying the Mediterranean area as an academic entity. The IMS was founded in 1997 as the result of an initiative to establish an interdisciplinary research-intensive institute dedicated to the fields of the Mediterranean Studies in Korea. It is situated within the Busan University of Foreign Studies (BUFS) and is currently the only research organization of its kind in Korea. During the course of a history spanning almost two decades, the IMS has expanded academic field of the Mediterranean Studies in South Korea through implementation of national research projects from the Ministry of Education in South Korea including Humanities Korea (HK, 인문한국지원사업), Humanities Korea Plus(HK+,인문한국플러스지원사업).

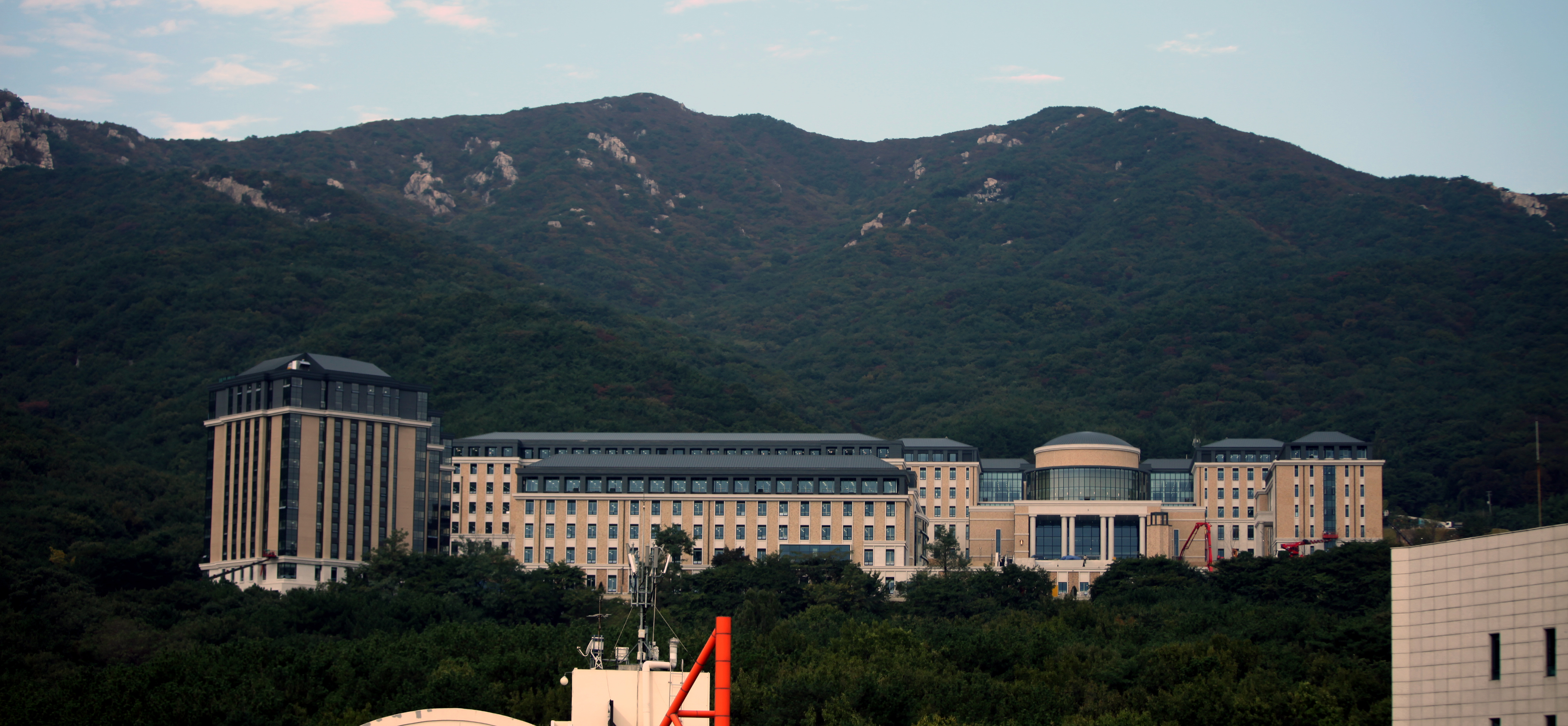
The campus overview of Busan University of Foreign Studies.

The IMS has produced academic accomplishment that are multifaceted and interdisciplinary. 1. IMS has released multiple academic publications with regular and irregular basis. The achievements span Humanities and Social Sciences, including the 'Mediterranean Humanities' series.

It also publishes an international Mediterranean Review (in English) and a domestic Mediterranean Area Studies, two scholarly journals dealing with the history, culture, environment, economy, politics and societies of the Mediterranean. 2. In the field of academic teaching, it provides university seminars and lectures both on site at BUFS and overseas. 3. Finally, in the field of academic exchange, the Institute holds international conferences, lectures, public panel debates, and workshops in cooperation with a wide range of universities and research institutes in the Mediterranean Area and beyond. The IMS intends to contribute towards further establishing Mediterranean Studies beyond its frontiers of native Korea, and to link this research focus with established institutes working on Europe, the Middle East, North Africa, or the Western and Arab world in general.

== IMS and HK [Humanities Korea] project ==
The IMS is currently supported and funded by the Humanities Korea (HK) Project of the Korea Research Foundation (KRF), a public organization operating under the Ministry of Education in Korea. The majority of the Institute’s academic activities is directed to meet the research agenda set by the KRF, especially in the field of Foreign Area Studies [Research Agenda: A Study on the Cultural Interactions of the Mediterranean Civilizations (Term: 2007.11-2017.8)]. The Institute declares its missions in liaison with the HK project as follows:

1. Securing the foundation and development of Mediterranean Studies
2. Collecting, analyzing and providing information on the nations in the Mediterranean area
3. Cultivating professional human resources for Mediterranean Studies

4. Establishing a Global Network between research organizations for Mediterranean Studies.

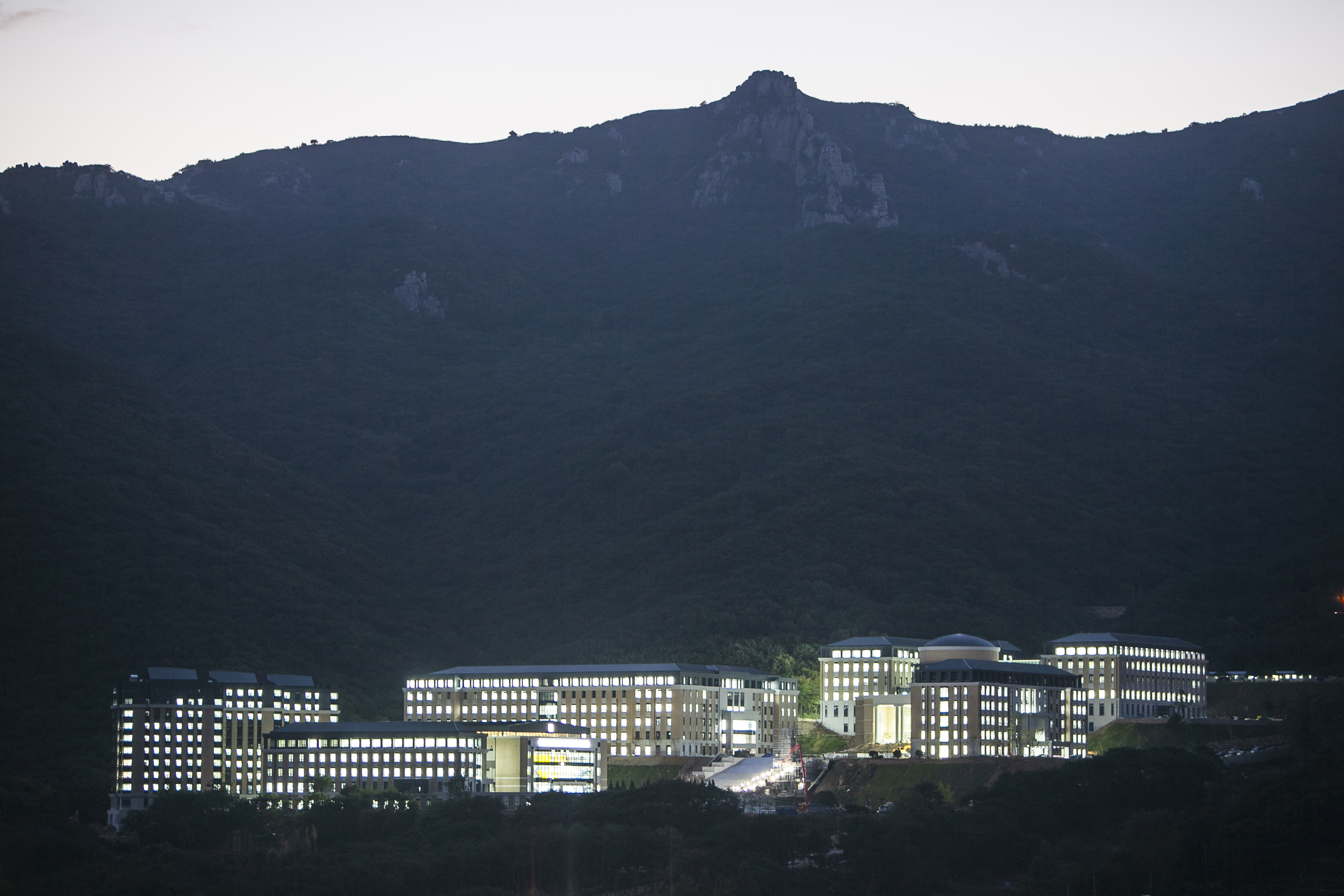
The night view of Busan University of Foreign Studies.

== Academic programs ==
=== International Mediterranean Conference (IMC) ===
The IMS organizes an annual International Mediterranean Conference (IMC) aimed at providing a global forum to explore the interplay between Mediterranean societies, cultures, and communities from the Middle Ages to the present. The Conference also sponsors the specific initiative of “Cultural Interactions of the Mediterranean Civilizations”.

The purpose of IMC is to bring scholars together from all over the world, for Mediterranean Studies in the fields of History, Arts, Archaeology, Philosophy, Sociology, Politics, International Relations, Economics, Business, and Sports, among others. Participation is solicited in presentations or discussions of papers, keynote speeches and chairing of a panel. The official language of the Conference is English.

=== Multilingual Mediterranean Web Service System (MMWS) ===
The IMS runs a search portal system on the web called Multilingual Mediterranean Web Service System (MMWS), which brings information together from Mediterranean contents in a webpage. The MMWS is an ever-expanding search engine that offers language information, news, stock quotes, information from databases and entertainment content on the Mediterranean. The features available in the MMWS may be freely accessed by an authorized and authenticated user (employee, member) or an anonymous site visitor.

== Mediterranean Review ==
The IMS publishes an international Mediterranean Review as part of its scholarly literature dealing with the history, culture, environment, economy, politics and societies of the Mediterranean. Mediterranean Review (ISSN 2005-0836) is the official biannual publication by the Institute for Mediterranean Studies (IMS). This journal publishes articles and book reviews discussing issues on both the Western and Eastern Mediterranean, from ancient to modern times. The journal is composed of studies in the fields of Commerce and Trade, Environment, Politics and Diplomacy, Religion, History, Literature, Linguistics, Intercultural Communication, Comparative Studies on Mediterranean Art and Culture, and other related subjects.

Mediterranean Review addresses Mediterranean regional affairs, and discusses crucial developments in culture and politics that are redefining the Mediterranean world. This unique publication deals with global issues such as Mediterranean influence on international affairs and interchange of ideas and cultures between Mediterranean countries. Mediterranean Review also pays attention to multiculturalism and complexity surrounding the Mediterranean region.

Articles are published in English, whether originally written in English or translated.

== Faculty ==
Currently under the direction of Yong-Soo Yun, Professor of Arabic Studies in BUFS, the IMS is a self-sustaining research institute based on interdisciplinary models, consisting of Permanent Faculty, Research Faculty, Affiliated Faculty and Research Associates. The faculty consists of dedicated scholars of the Mediterranean areas including Arabic, French, Greek, Italian, Spanish, and Turkish studies among others, with research specialties ranging from archaeology and the arts to history, language, literature, philosophy, and religion.

The faculty members teach and conduct research on aspects of the cultural and socio-historical interactions that have marked the Mediterranean civilizations in the contexts of the Middle East, Southern and Mid-Eastern Europe, and North Africa. They also investigate the multiple relations of the Mediterranean with other regions and areas of the world. Their work engages with at once historical and also pressing social, economic, religious and cultural issues.
