= Sogang University Korean Language Education Center =

The Sogang University Korean Language Education Center (Hangul: 한국어교육원) provides instruction in Korean language to foreigners in Korea in Mapo-gu, Seoul. The Sogang program is one of the three Korean language programs approved by the Blakemore Foundation for its advanced study grants for 2013.

== History ==
The Korean Language Education Center was established in 1990. Approximately 2,600 students enroll in the language education center annually.

== Korean Immersion Program ==
The Korean Immersion Program is a five-week program offered during the summer. The program consists of Korean language and culture classes of various skill levels. The program also puts an emphasis on active participation through speaking and conversation.

== See also ==
- Language learning
- King Sejong Institute
- Korean as a foreign language
- Myongji University Korean Language Institute
- Seoul National University Korean Language Education Center
- Yonsei University Korean Language Institute
- Busan University of Foreign Studies
