= Kang Hyounhwa =

South Korean linguist (born 1963)

- 강현화

President of King Sejong Institute Foundation
- In office 28 September 2018 – 27 September 2021
- Minister: Do Jong-hwan; Park Yang-woo
- Preceded by: Song Hyang-geun
- Succeeded by: Lee Hai-young

Personal details
- Born: 1963 (age 62–63)
- Education: Yonsei University

Kang Hyunhwa (Korean: 강현화; Hanja: 姜炫和; born 1963) is a South Korean professor of Korean language and literature at Yonsei University served as the 2nd President - and the first woman President - of King Sejong Institute Foundation responsible for operating King Sejong Institutes and developing their programmes from 2018 to 2021.

Kang had served as a member of the Korean Language Deliberation Council at Ministry of Culture, Sports and Tourism from 2011 to 2015 responsible for planning Korean language education, preserving the Korean language and updating its system and grammar mandated by the Framework Act on National Language.

In 1999 Kang was one of the first professors to join the first-ever department specialised in Korean language education for foreigners, Kyung Hee University's Department of Korean language. She later led as its Dean from 2003 to 2007. In 2010 Kang moved to her alma mater and continued teaching as a professor.

Kang has been active in academia in areas of Korean language education as summarised as below.

- The Korean Association for Lexicography
  - Vice President from 2015 to 2018
  - Director for editing from 2009 to 2014
- The Korea Association of Foreign Languages Education
  - Vice President from 2017 to 2018
  - Member of Editorial Board
- Korean Language and Literature Society
  - Vice President from 2017 to 2018
  - Member of Editorial Board from 2019
- The Korean Language Culture Education Society
  - President from 2015 to 2017
  - Advisor from 2019
- Korea Grammar Education Circle
  - Founding member in 2004
  - Director for recruitment from 2004 to 2010
  - Director for research from 2010 to 2012
  - Member of Editorial Board from 2010 to 2014
  - Vice President from 2012 to 2018
  - Chair of Editorial Board from 2016 to 2018
  - President from 2018 to 2019
  - Advisor from 2020
- The Applied Linguistics Association of Korea
  - Director for Editing from 2007 to 2009
- The Korean Society Of Bilingualism
  - Director for Editing from 2007 to 2009
- The National Language Deliberation Council, Ministry of Culture, Sports and Tourism

Kang holds three degrees - from a bachelor to a doctorate - in Korean language and literature from Yonsei University.
