= Seoul National University Korean Language Education Center =

The Seoul National University Korean Language Education Center (서울대학교 한국어 교육센터, 서울大學校韓國語教育센터) provides Korean as a foreign language instruction to foreigners in Korea. Located in Gwanak-gu, Seoul, the program is one of the three Korean language programs approved by the Blakemore Foundation for its advanced study grants for 2013.

== See also ==
- Language learning
- King Sejong Institute
- Korean as a foreign language
- Myongji University Korean Language Institute
- Yonsei University Korean Language Institute
- Sogang University Korean Language Education Center
- Busan University of Foreign Studies
