= Song Myung-soon =

South Korean general (b. 1958)

- Born: 1958 (age 67–68); Hoengseong-gun, Gangwon-do, South Korea
- Military career
- Allegiance: South Korea
- Branch: Republic of Korea Army
- Rank: Brigadier general

Korean name
- Hangul: 송명순
- RR: Song Myeongsun
- MR: Song Myŏngsun

Song Myung-soon is a former officer of the Republic of Korea Army. She began her career in the Women's Army Corps and rose to command one of its battalions. She has since worked at the South Korean-United States Combined Forces Command and in the offices of the South Korean Joint Chiefs of Staff. In December 2010 Song became the sixth South Korean woman to be promoted to the rank of brigadier-general and the first to come from a combat arm. She was placed on the reservist forces two years later.

== Early life and career ==
Song was born in 1958. She attended Yeungnam University and graduated with a bachelor's degree in political science and foreign affairs. Later in her career Song attended Kyonggi University from which she received a master's degree in national security. Song joined the Republic of Korea Army's Women's Army Corps (WAC) in 1981. At the time of her initial basic training she was mother of a young child and later described it as a challenging time.

Song rose to command a battalion of the WAC and also its special forces unit. Song later worked at the joint South Korean-United States Combined Forces Command and served as commander of the 2nd Army Basic Training Centre and head of psychological warfare in the civil affairs department of Second Operations Command. By 2010 she held the rank of colonel and was serving with the joint civilian operations department of the offices of the South Korean Joint Chiefs of Staff.

== General officer ==
In December 2010 Song became the sixth South Korean woman to be promoted to general officer rank in the South Korean army. She was the first South Korean female general to hold a combat position (the previous five women had all been from the nursing service). Song stated that "the roles of female soldiers and officers have become more important than before" and that the date of her promotion would be "a turning point in the military. I think that the military will pay more attention to employing and placing female soldiers in the right positions to create synergy".

In 2012 she was part of a delegation of South Korean officers that attended celebrations in Seoul of the 36th Armed Forces Day of the United Arab Emirates.
