= Yeungnam University =

Private university in South Korea

Coordinates: 35°50′03″N 128°45′29″E

- 영남대학교
- Type: Private
- Established: 1947
- President: Oe Chool Choi
- Students: 31,218
- Undergraduates: 28,429
- Postgraduates: 2,789
- Location: Gyeongsan, North Gyeongsang, South Korea
- Colors: YU Blue; YU Sky blue
- Mascot: Pruma
- Website: http://www.yu.ac.kr/

Korean name
- Hangul: 영남대학교
- Hanja: 嶺南大學校
- RR: Yeongnam daehakgyo
- MR: Yŏngnam taehakkyo

Yeungnam University (Korean: 영남대학교) is a private research university located in Gyeongsan, North Gyeongsang, South Korea. The university's predecessors, Taegu College and Chunggu College, were founded in Daegu in 1947 and 1950 respectively. In 1967, the two colleges were merged by President Park Chung Hee to form Yeungnam University. In 1972, the university's new main campus opened in Gyeongsan east of Daegu. The university includes colleges of Law and Medicine as well as a university hospital. It ranked 1st in the rate for passing the bar exam for the second straight year (2015~2016), it also ranked 6th in providing CEOs in Korea's top 100 companies (2015), and 6th in providing the CEOs in Companies listed on KOSDAQ (2014). Yeungnam University is ranked 501 in the Academic Ranking of World Universities by Shanghai Jiao Tong University.

== History ==
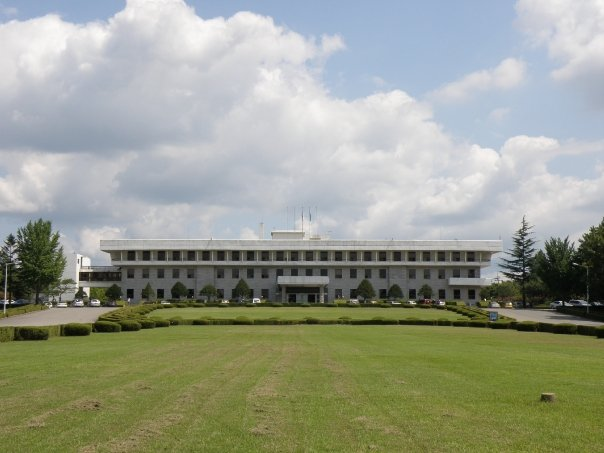
Yeungnam University main academic building

Yeungnam University was established in 1967 through the merger of Daegu College, founded in 1947, and Chunggu College, founded in 1950. Lee Dong-nyoung was inaugurated as the first chairperson of the board of trustees. That same year, the university was officially approved by the Ministry of Education to begin with six colleges: the College of Liberal Arts, the College of Engineering, the College of Law and Political Science, the College of Commerce and Economics, the College of Pharmacy, and Evening Programs. At the outset, the university offered 35 undergraduate departments and 12 graduate departments. On January 1, 1968, Shin Ki-suck was inaugurated as the university's first president, and in 1969, construction of the main campus in Gyeongsan commenced. In the early 1970s, the Graduate School of Management and Graduate Departments of Korean Language and Literature, Law, and Economics were established. Subsequently, the Main Administration Offices, College of Liberal Arts, College of Law & Political Science, and College of Commerce and Economics were relocated from the Daegu campus. In the mid-1970s, the 21-story main library, serving as faculty offices, and the main administration building were completed. In the 1980s, Yeungnam University Hospital, the Foreign Language Institute, and the University Museum were also established.

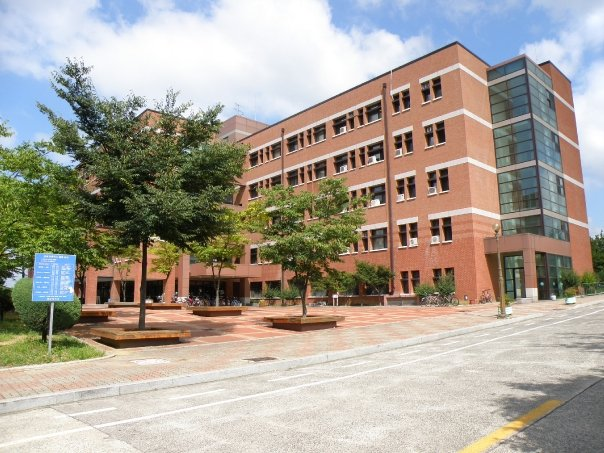
Soje Gwan – Yeungnam University MSE Building

In 1996, Yeungnam University is approved as an Excellent University in Undergraduate and Graduate Schools, and also as the "Best University" in the fields of business and International Trade, by the Korean University Education Committee. In 1997, Yeungnam University was chosen as a "Government-Sponsored Program for Science Education" in the area of basic science and laboratory education and selected as the supervising university for the model Technopark Project. Following the year Yeungnam University was chosen as a Supervising University in Machinery field and as an Attending University in Information Technology field for the program of rearing local universities in the Brain Korea Project as well as the university was selected by the Ministry of Science and Technology as Research Information Center for Textiles and Apparel Science.

In the year 2000, Yeungnam University established the graduate department of Architectural Design, Multimedia Communications, Bio-technology and graduate departments of Sino-Korean and Textile Engineering in Doctor's degree. In 2001 University changed the School of Commerce and Economics to the Schools of Finance and Business with the School of Finance and Economics and the School of International Economics and Business. In 2003 the Graduate School of Clinical Pharmacy approved, starting with the graduate department of Clinical Pharmacy. The establishment of the Graduate School of Sports Science approved, starting with the graduate department of Sports Science.

Each year, international students join at Yeungnam University for their Masters or Ph.D. degree and proceed on their research work. Most of the students are from China, Uzbekistan, Indonesia, Bangladesh, India, Nepal, Bulgaria, Egypt, Malaysia, Pakistan, Mongolia, Vietnam, Poland, Japan, Peru, Senegal and other different countries.

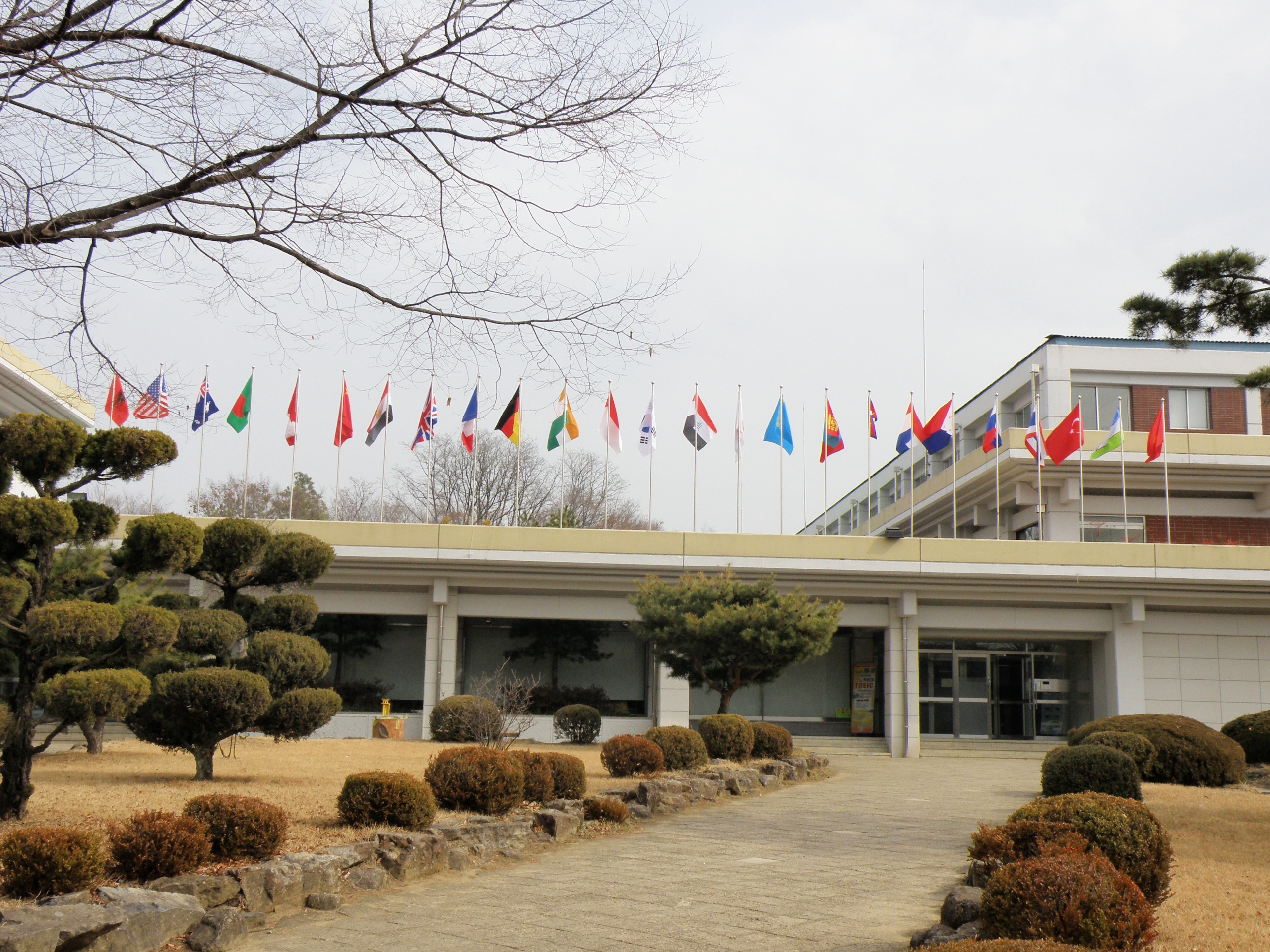
Yeungnam University International Student Center

Yeungnam University currently has academic agreement with various universities around the world including the University of Montana, Old Dominion University, University of Michigan, State University of New York at Albany, Iowa State University of United States, University of Alberta of Canada, Université de Haute-Alsace (since 1999), Novosibirsk State University, Novosibirsk State Technical University of Russia, Fukui University and Shinshu University of Japan and other several Universities of Uzbekistan and China like Nanjing University, Nankai University and Lingnan University, Hong Kong.

University rankings

Global – Overall
- QS World: 901-950 (2026)

In 2010, Yeungnam University is selected one of the top 10 Asian International Universities for the dramatic changes in global education of the new millennium by Asian Correspondent news report.

In 2019, DOAJ and PubMed Central started to index the Yeungnam University Journal of Medicine, a peer-reviewed and open-access journal published by the Yeungnam University College of Medicine since 1984.

== Campus ==
Yeungnam University has two campuses. Gyeongsan is the main campus and other is Daegu campus. Located in the city of Gyeongsan in the south-eastern part of the Korean Peninsula, the city is adjacent to the Daegu metropolis, the third largest city in South Korea.

Yeungnam University has 22,000 undergraduate students, 3,500 graduate students, and 1,000 faculty members and staff with fine facilities and academic organizations. There are also 11 auxiliary organizations, including the Center for International Programs, the Foreign Language Institute, and 38 academic research institutes on the scenic 900-acre (3.6 km^{2}) campus.

== Academics ==
=== Colleges and departments ===
- College of Liberal Arts

Korean Language and Literature, English Language & Literature, German Language & Literature, Korean History, Cultural Anthropology, Sociology, Japanese Language & Literature, French Language & Literature, Philosophy, History, Psychology, Media and Communication.

- College of Science

Mathematics, Physics, Biology, Statistics, Chemistry, Biochemistry.

- College of Engineering

School of Chemical Engineering, Civil and Environmental Engineering, Mechanical Engineering, Electrical Engineering, Electronic Engineering, Computer Science and Engineering, Communication Engineering, Urban Planning and Engineering, Materials Science and Engineering.

- College of Law

Law.

- College of Political Science & Public Administration

Political Science and Diplomacy, Regional Development and Welfare Administration, Public Administration,

- College of Commerce & Economics

Economics and Finance, Management, International Economics and Business.

- College of Medicine

The Premedical Course, Medicine.

- College of Pharmacy
- College of Natural Resources

Food Industry Management, Landscape Architecture, Food Technology and Food Service Industry, Horticultural Science, Forest Resources, Applied Microbiology.

- College of Human Ecology & Kinesiology

Family and Housing Studies, Kinesiology, Food and Nutrition.

- College of Education

Education, English Education, Mathematics Education, Special Physical Education, Korean Language Education, Archaic Sino-Korean Education, Early Childhood Education.

- College of Music
- College of Art & Design

Arts, Design.

- School of Textiles
- School of Biotechnology
- School of Chinese Language & Culture
- School of Architecture
- College of Basic Studies
- Interdisciplinary Study

=== Research programs ===
- Brain Korea (BK21) Program

The Research Manpower Development Center for Mechanical Part Industry, which was initiated and is supported by the Ministry of Education & Human Resources Development as the second phase of Brain Korea 21(BK21), plays an important role of specializing and enhancing the research capacity of regional graduate schools, thereby tries to develop regional R&D personnel clusters in local industry. The School of Display and Chemical Engineering(DsChE) and The Department of Information and Communication Engineering at Yeungnam University has been selected as one of the second phase BK21 (Brain Korea 21) programs in the Chemical Engineering and Telecommunication areas respectively, which was supposed to educate the graduate students to provide the creative research resources for the regional IT industries. The DsChE is also going to navigate its program intentionally to construct the prototype industry-university cooperation system by benchmarking Kyushu University in Japan. Due to the selection of the chemical engineering program of the BK21 regional program in Daegu/Gyeongbuk area in 2006 the DsChE has become the only chemical engineering department to perform the ABEEK program, NURI program, and the BK21 program in the nation simultaneously, and for this many foreign students from various countries like Bangladesh, China, India, Malaysia, Indonesia and Vietnam receive scholarship and join in the laboratory like PSDC into the chemical engineering and WINLAB into the Information and Communication Engineering department to pursue their research and higher study.

- NURI Program

The main purpose of NURI or New University for regional innovation program is to train specialists of embedded technology to lead ubiquitous era and contribute regional economics combining practical ability with international competitiveness. School of Materials Science and Engineering of Yeungnam University receives 1.3 million dollars annually to enhance the quality of teaching and learning environment for undergraduate students to provide materials engineers to regional materials and devices industries under Association of Human Resources Initiative for Advanced Materials and Devices(AHRIAMD) which is supported by the Ministry of Education and Human Resources Development through the New University for Regional Innovation (NURI) program. The School of Display and Chemical Engineering(DsChE) at Yeungnam University was selected as one of the participating institutions of NURI (New University for Regional Innovation) program sponsored strategically by the Korean Ministry of Education and Human Resources. The DsChE aims at educating and cultivating chemical engineers specifically suited for regional display industry. The school's mission shifted from the conventional petrochemical industry oriented education to the new display and IT industry oriented education, to achieve the goals set for the NURI program.

- Polymer Gel Research Cluster Center

The Polymer Gel Research Cluster Center (PGRC) at Yeungnam University is a project to be executed for nine years for establishing a new material R&D cluster for fusion, type high, tech organic polymer gel in Gyeongsangbuk, do as one of "local R&D cluster projects" with the support of the Ministry of Commerce, Industry and Energy.

- RIC

The Regional Innovation Center(RIC) for Wi-Media was started the part of Wireless Multi Media System Technology. The RIC set up an industry-University research institute cooperative systems to provide support to technology foundation and technology innovation for IT industry cluster at Daegu-Gyeongbuk. A strong regional base provides opportunities for ideas and products to springboard beyond the region.

=== Research Institutes ===
Institute of the Humanities, Institute of Industrial Technology, Institute of Resources Development, National Unification Research Institute, Environmental Research Institute, Medical Science Research Center, Institute of Sports Science, Institute of Legal Studies, Institute of Biotechnology, Institute of Art & Design, Entrepreneurial Management Center, Garlic Research Institute, Research Institute of Disaster Prevention, Institute of Statistics, Institute of Medical Engineering, Research Institute of Photonics and Nano Science, Center for Counseling and Research of Korean language, Research Institute of Regional Innovation, Regional Research Institute for Fiber & Fashion Materials, Institute of Natural Science, Institute of Social Science, Institute of Korean Culture, Yeungnam Regional Development Institute, Institute of Management and Economy Research, Institute of Gerontology, Institute of Drug Research, Institute of Information & Communication, Institute of Soybean Fermentation and Food Research, Research Institute of School Education, Hanwoo Research Institute, Research Institute of Mechanical Engineering & Technology, Research Institute of Human Ecology, Institute of Materials Technology, Institute of Clean Technology, China Research Center, Rural Development Institute, Dokdo Institute, Architecture Research Institute, Institute for International Development Cooperation, and President PARK CHUNG HEE Saemaul Research Institute.

=== Library ===
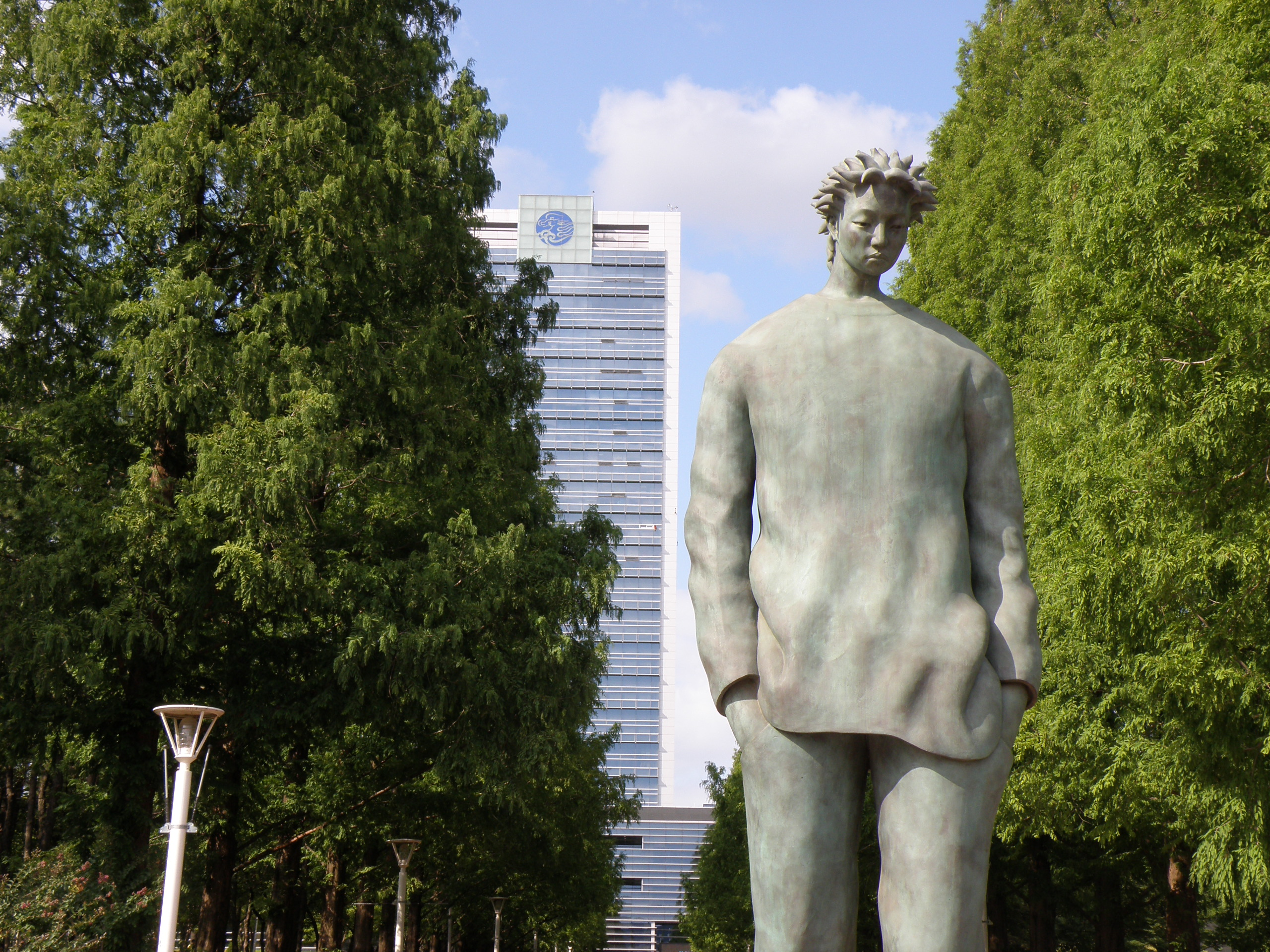
Yeungnam University Central Library

Yeungnam University library was originally established on the Daegu campus in 1967 by merging the two college libraries of Daegu and Chunggu, which were founded in 1947 and 1950, respectively. The present University Library moved to the Gyeongsan main campus in 1974. Now, it comprises a main library and two branches. The university central library has a gigantic and diverse collection of books, journals, international papers and periodicals. YU central library is the tallest building of the campus as a landmark of the university. The 21-story main library has five reading rooms by subjective areas, a computer and multimedia lab, two general reading rooms, 4 group study rooms, and 24 carrells. The science library branch has a reading room for pure science and technology, a periodicals room, a computer and multimedia lab, and four general reading rooms. The number of the seats of the science library is 2,077. The Daegu campus has a medical library branch which has 224 seats. As of February 2007, the University Library holds more than 1,478,491 books including bound ones, and carries 2,830 titles of domestic and foreign periodicals along with 24,048 titles of E-Journals. It also stores personal collections donated by 28 private collectors. The books are classified according to the 3rd edition of the Korean decimal classification.

=== Admissions ===
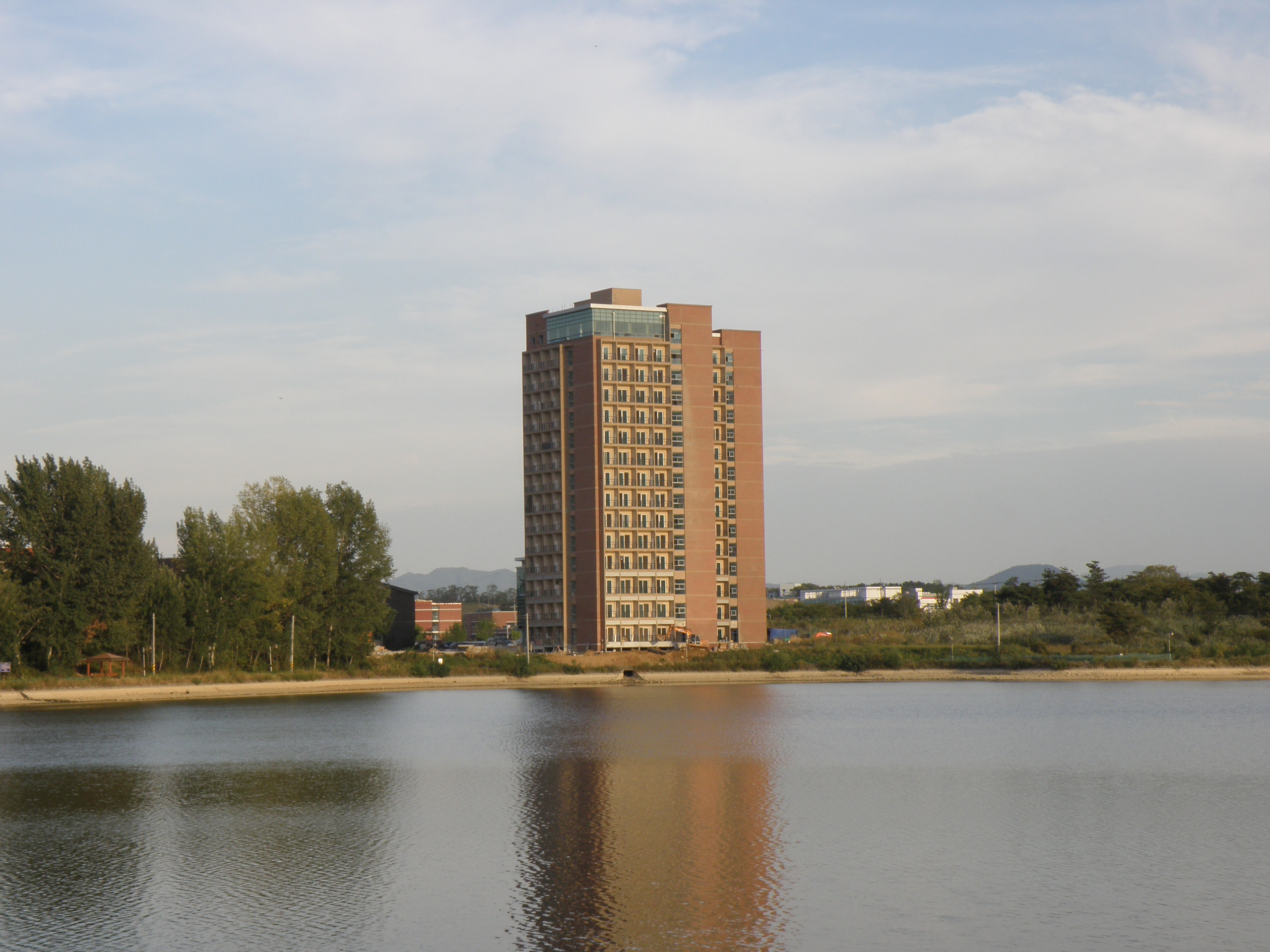
Dormitory of Yeungnam University

Freshmen are admitted to undergraduate programs once a year. The students who have graduated from accredited high schools or who have passed the Ministry of Education administered High School Graduation Qualification Examination or the students who have completed a minimum of twelve years of formal education in foreign countries are considered as qualified for those mentioned above under the pertinent education law. International applicants who have completed or will complete a bachelor's degree from regular colleges prior to admission and have a record that indicates good potential for advanced study and research in one of the disciplines at Yeungnam University are encouraged to apply for admission to graduate study.

=== International programs ===
The principal responsibilities of the Center of International Programs are to

- Develop and manage exchange programs with foreign institutions; student exchange programs, faculty exchange programs.
- Arrange joint seminars, international symposiums, special lectures or other international events to promote quality international education.
- Provide administrative support for faculty members and students of Yeungnam University and of foreign institutions.
- Advise on visas, studying abroad, University Referral Program and publishing English certificates.

== Student life ==
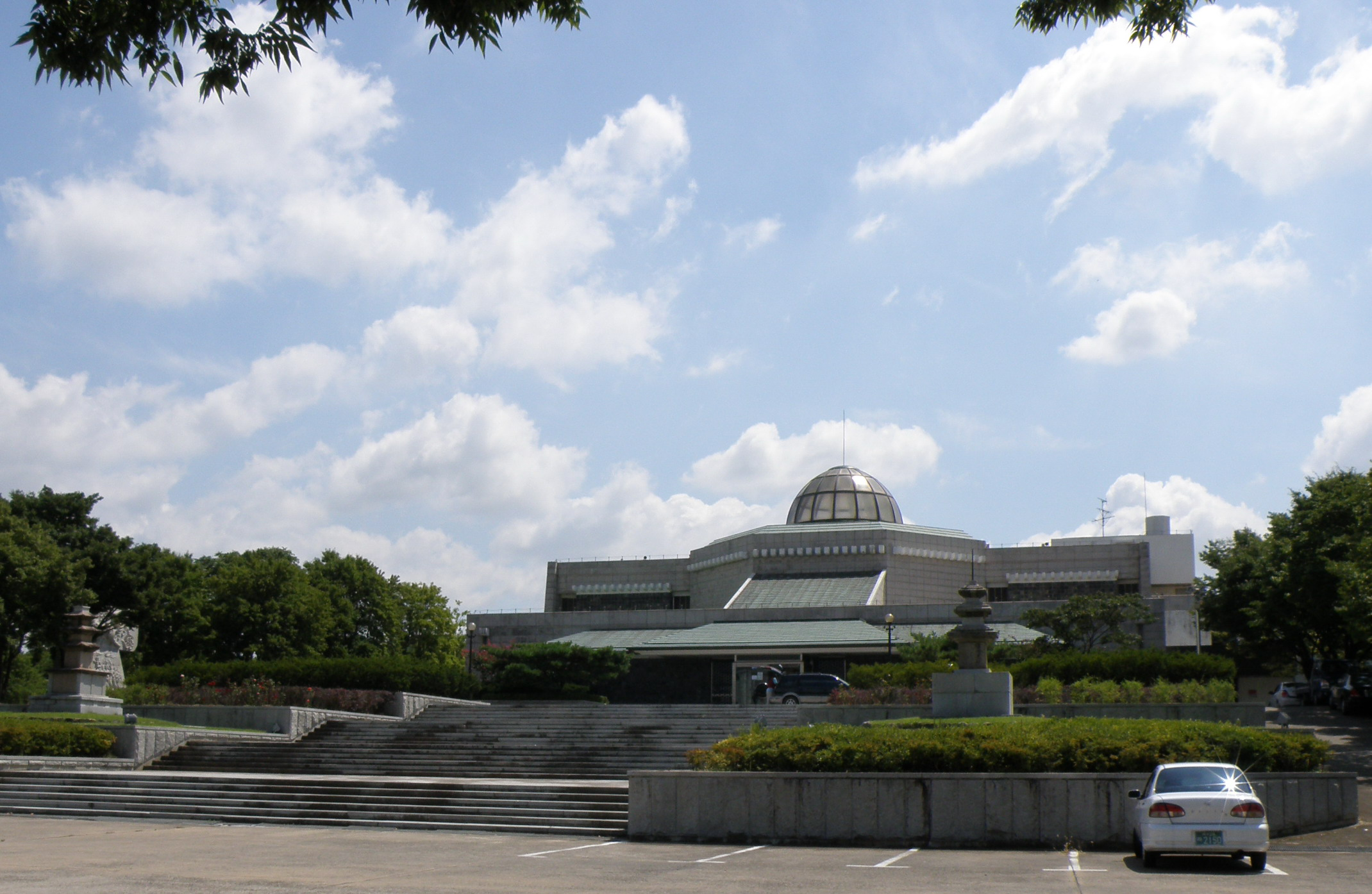
Yeungnam University Museum

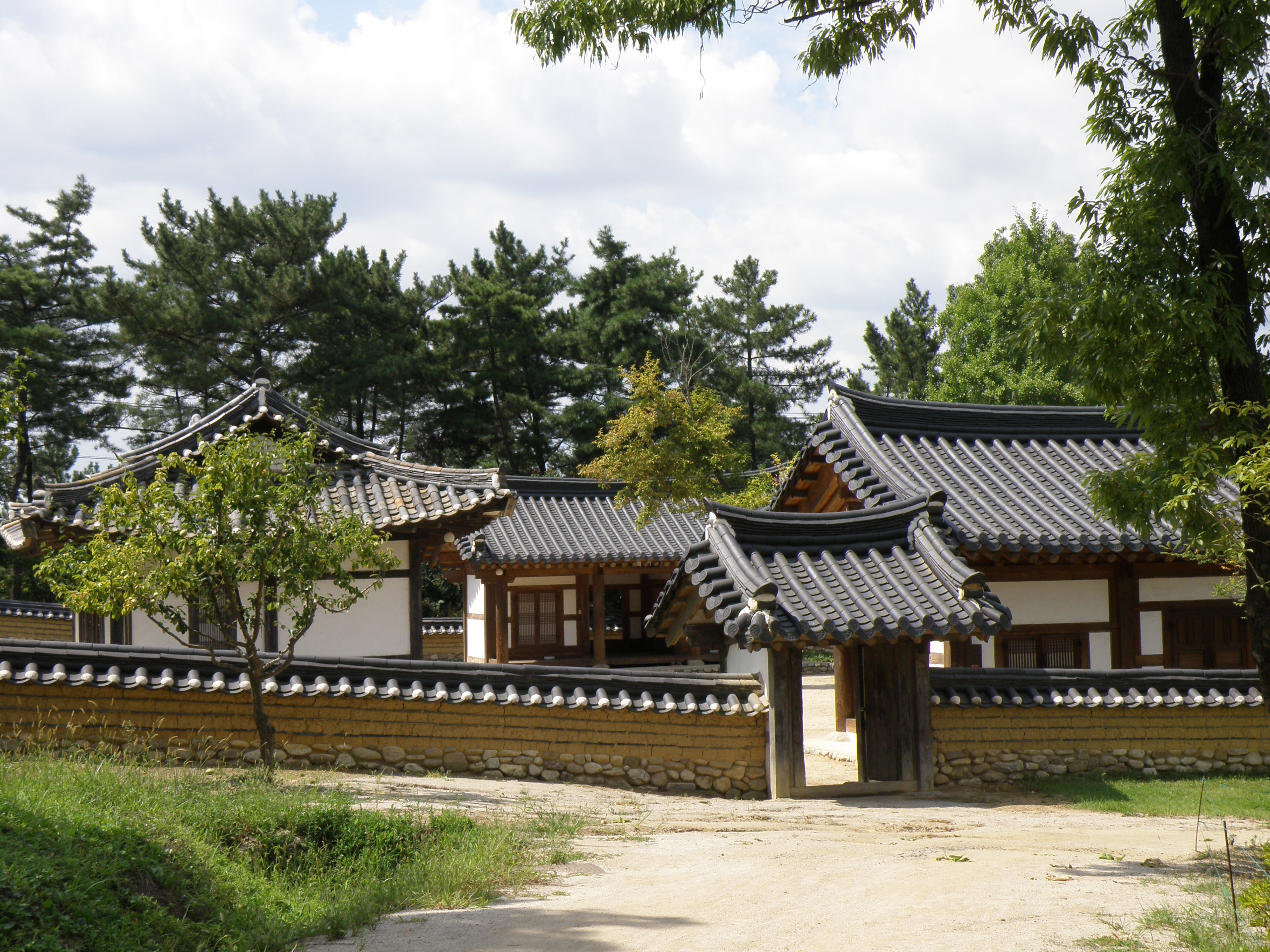
Yeungnam University Folklore

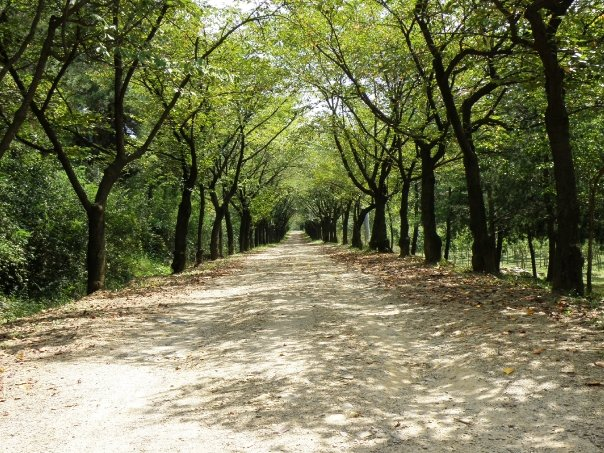
Love Road at Yeungnam University Campus

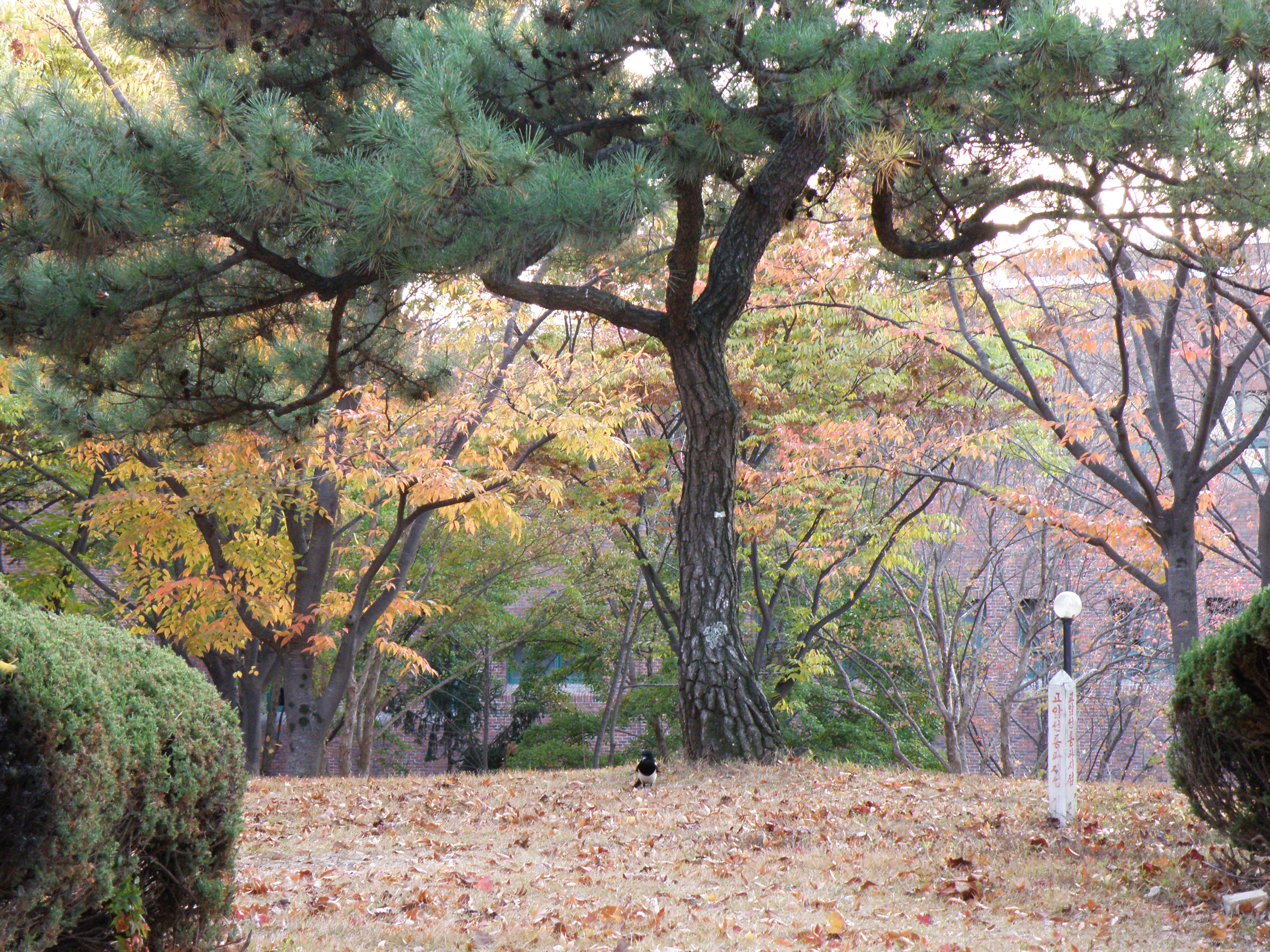
Yeungnam University Campus in late Autumn

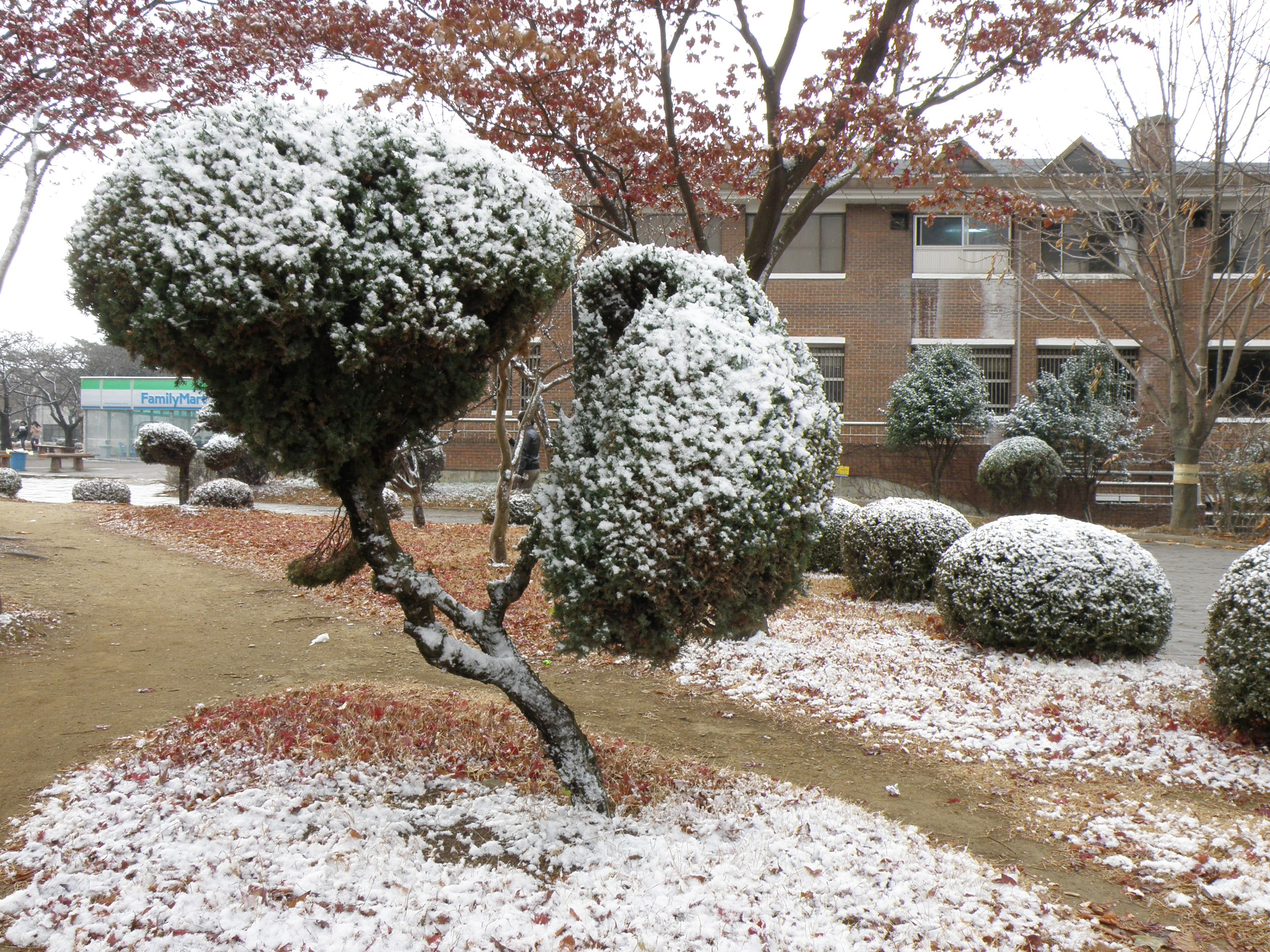
Yeungnam University Campus in Winter

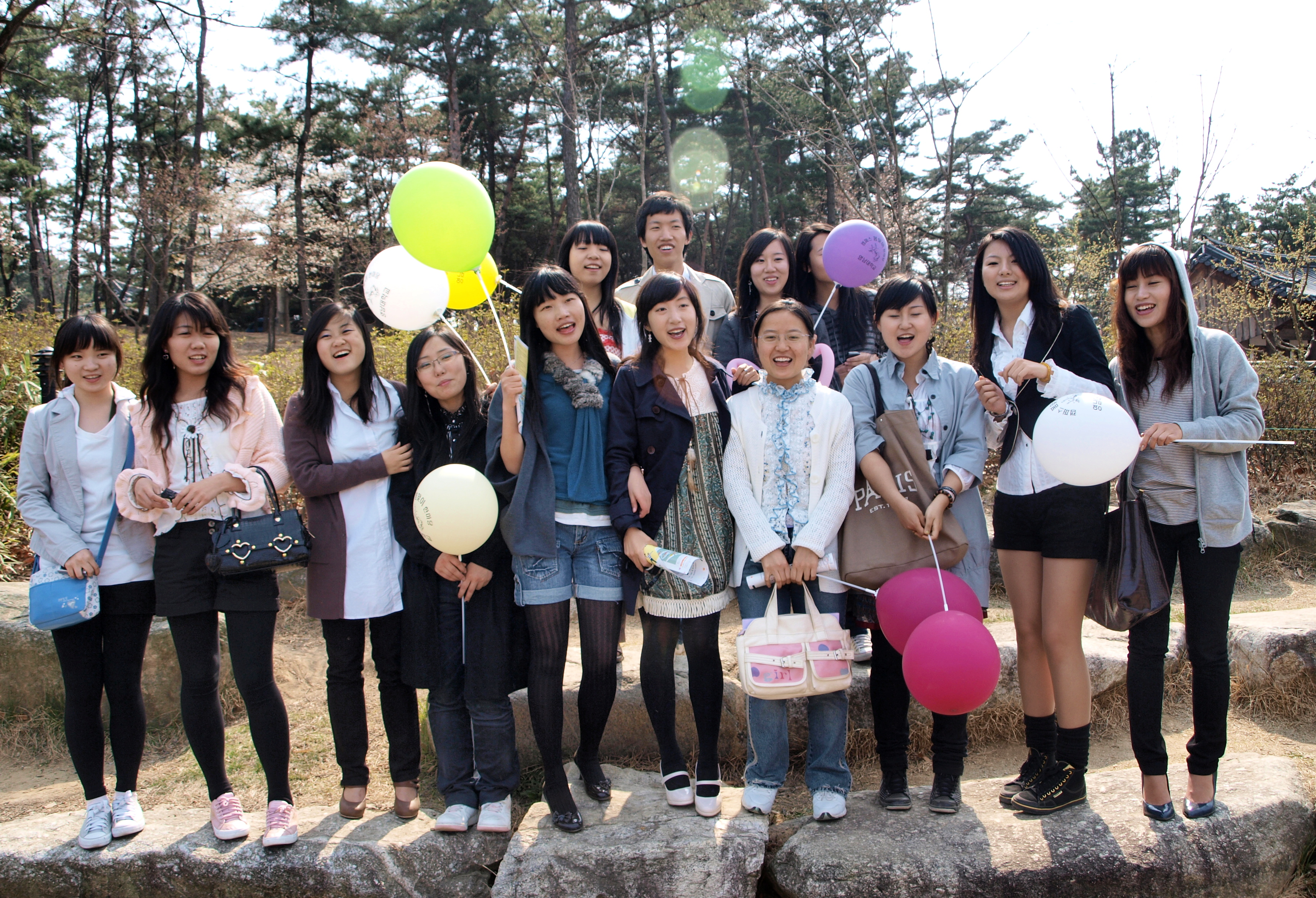
Students are Singing Their Folk Songs at Cherry Blossom Festival

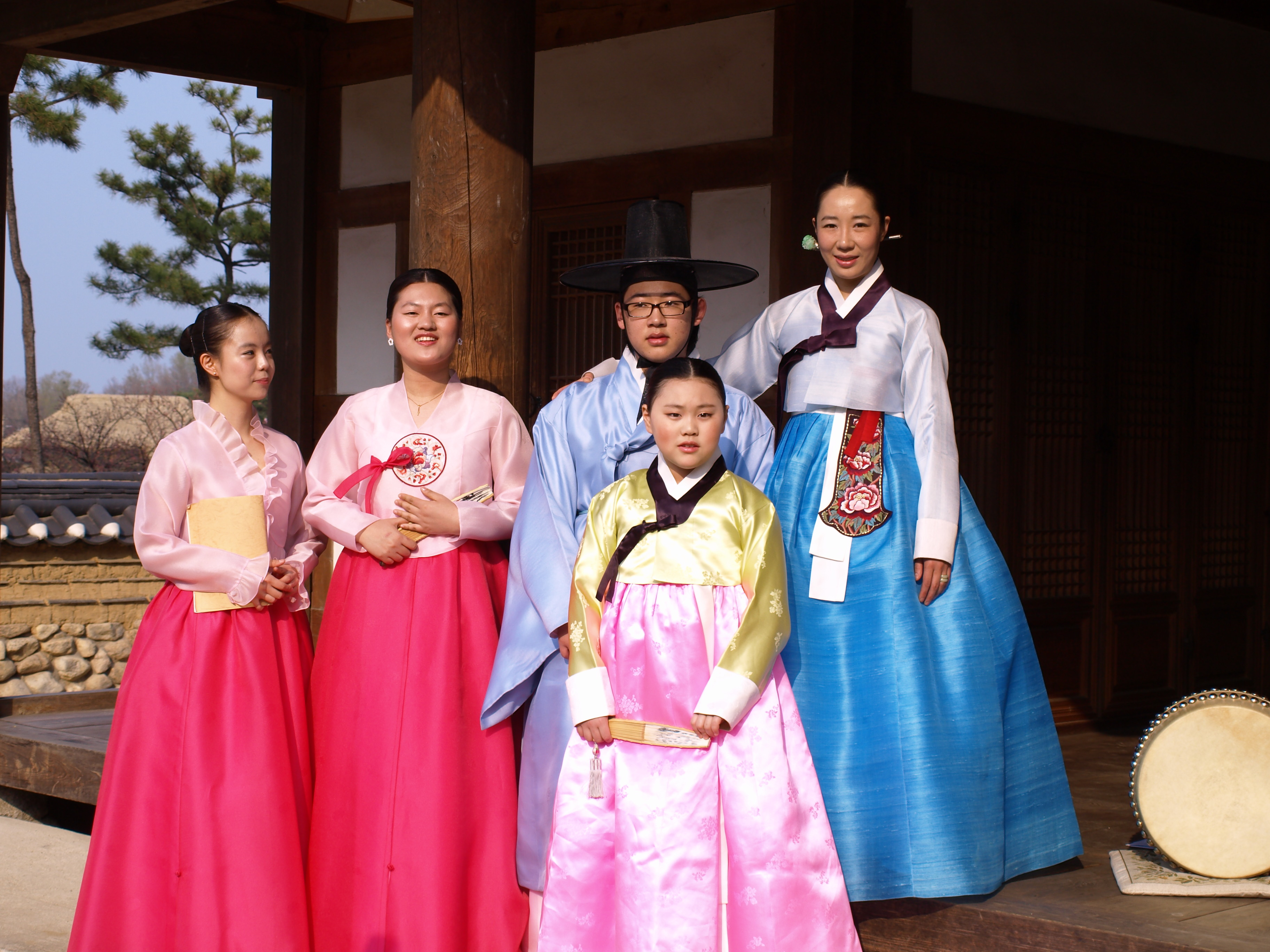
Students are Performing at Chunma Festival with their traditional costume

=== Facilities ===
- Computer Center and Library

Yeungnam University provides facilities for the students. University library is equipped with books, journals, periodicals of both domestic and foreign. The Institute of Information and Computing Systems (IICS) is supporting the academic and administrative activities by providing the state-of-art information technology such as efficient group-wares, gigabit network, high capacity servers, and mobile environment for the wireless voice and data communications. It plays a major role in planning for the advanced networks, telecommunications, and computing systems to build a futuristic intelligent campus named as i-campus. University also provides high speed internet service and Wi-Fi into the campus area.

- Dormitories

The university opened dormitory facilities in May 1973, for those who need on campus housing. These facilities are opened for undergraduates (mainly) and graduate students. At present six residence halls, including one self-boarding apartment type hall, accommodate 1,200 students. A modern style dining hall in which more than 500 people can eat at a time, a video room with a big screen TV and a video player, study rooms, computer labs, resting rooms, ping-pong tables, snack stores and exercise rooms are facilities among others provided for dormitory residents.

- Health Service Center

The University Health Service Center was established in December 1967, for the purpose of undertaking the health care for students, faculty members, and administration staff. The Center provides annual physical examination for students, environment sanitation on the campus, and preventive inoculation if required. It also takes charge of health counseling for students and university members.

- Center for International Programs

The former Foreign Language Institute and the former Office of International Affairs has been merged since March 2002. The new merged organization is named as "Center for International Programs", and it has two teams, one is "International Education", and the other is "International Cooperation".

The main functions of the International Education Team are to offer the foreign language classes such as English, Chinese, Japanese, etc., as well as the Korean Language Program.

- University Museum and Folklore

The University Museum was founded in May 1968 on the Daegu Campus with the collections of the Institute of Shilla-Gaya culture. The University Museum performs to survey, collect, educate and preserve both archaeological and anthropological fields. The displays arranged within the museum are in great part the results of excavation and research both Shilla and Gaya Culture. In addition to them, the museum has made great effort to have important collections including old maps, documents, paintings, and calligraphy. It stores over 13,000 historically important items. Among them, the collection of old maps is the richest one in Korean museum. The University Museum is not only for students but also open to the public. To maximize its function, the museum started a public education programs from kids to senior citizens. With its various programs, the museum become a cultural core of the community.

Also the university Museum has a folklore park. Folklore Garden which covers area of 70,000 m^{2} is famous and unique place in Korean universities. Folklore Garden of Yeungnam University consists of 6 traditional houses located by the east to Mirror Lake and near the cherry blossom promenade (so-called love road) on the hill. The folklore park consists of 7 traditional buildings inside the park as examples of a traditional tile-roof house, a traditional house of the middle-class, a private school of Josun period and a pavilion which was being used as a cottage to upper class scholars. These buildings are frequently used as lecture rooms for the university students and kids summer school program running by the museum.

=== Student services ===
- EASY – Education & Administration System for Yeungnam University
- Health and Welfare
- One-Stop Service Center
- Student Union
- ROTC Program (Reserve Officer's Training Corps)
- Financial Aid

=== Student activities ===
- Foundation-Day and CHUNMA Festival

The Chunma Festival in memory of Yeungnam University's Foundation Day is held in mid May.

- SAE Mini Baja KOREA at Yeungnam University

SAE Mini Baja KOREA is an event which is aimed at creating an opportunity for college students to apply their classroom engineering knowledge to designing and producing an automobile. In 1996, the school of Mechanical Engineering started this contest, named "The Nation-Wide Contest of Automobiles made by College Students" which is held annually to inspire college students' desire for creation; to let them produce an automobile based on stated regulations; and to have them learn to accept the results after doing their best in competition.

- Student-Governed Activities

Student activities in many fields are supported and promoted in my university. There are many self-governing student organizations such as General Student Council and other student organizations. The General Student Council, which represents all 20,000 students of my university, tries to enhance and support both academic and cultural activities of students to obtain their personal development while they are in college. These activities can help them to prepare contribution to our society in the future.

- University Newspaper

The Yeungdae Shinmun (campus vernacular newspaper) was first published in January 1968, by merging the Daegu and Chunggu College's newspapers which were first published in June and December, respectively, in the year of 1954. The campus newspaper is currently published weekly during the academic term, and carries university news, information on new development in learning here and abroad, scholarly articles, and creative writings by the faculty and students.

The Yeungnam Observer had published a four-page tabloid English monthly since 1969. Then it changed its format from a tabloid to a magazine since 1994. It was originally named The Yeungnam Chronicle, however in 1982 the monthly was renamed The Yeungnam Observer. The papers, both in Korean and English, are edited by students under the supervision of faculty members.

- University Broadcasting System

Like many other large universities, Yeungnam University has its own radio broadcasting station. University Broadcasting System(UBS) was established in 1965 and has provided music, news and other features on academic affairs, both on and off campus.

=== Alumni Association ===
The Yeungnam University Alumni Association was organized in 1969, February 16. At present there are more than 27 branch offices throughout the country, including Seoul, Busan, Masan, Changwon, Gyeongsan, and Jeju island; and some branches in foreign soil making a list of New York City, Chicago, Washington D.C., Atlanta (the USA), Vancouver, Toronto (Canada), and Indonesia and England. The YUAA can be catalogued even according to the alumni's colleges, majors, and their work places. The YUAA Office Hall was purchased in 1972 at Daemyung-Dong, Daegu, which was the first among all college alumni associations in South Korea to be used only for the purpose of alumni services. The YUAA built a New Office Hall on the building site of 462-pyung at Shinchun-Dong, Daegu, in February 1995, of the size of 5-story building including the basement. In September 1996 it became to own an annex of 4-story building with the basement that made the YUAA Office Hall own the real estate larger than any other alumni association in South Korea might have.

==== Notable alumni ====
- Kim Kwang-yong, North Gyeongsang governor
- Lee Hee-joon, actor
- Lee Chan-won, singer
- Park So-jin, singer (Girl's Day)
- Song Myung-soon, Republic of Korea Army general
- Yang Joon-hyuk, professional baseball player
- Shin Tae-yong, football coach and manager
- Kim Kiseo, creator of Roiworld and Digipoem
- Dr. Joon-Jin Song, Prominent Professor of Statistical Science, Baylor University.

== See also ==
- List of colleges and universities in South Korea
- Education in South Korea
- Process Systems Design and Control Laboratory
- Scholarships in Korea

== Notes ==
- http://www.yu.ac.kr/ - History of Yeungnam University
- http://observer.yu.ac.kr/ - Yeungnam Observer
- http://www.yu.ac.kr/file.php?seq=239 – Guidelines for International Students
- http://ciss.yu.ac.kr/index.jsp – About Yeungnam University
- http://www.yu.ac.kr/campus_tour/main_map_eng.php – Campus Cyber Tour
- http://www.yu.ac.kr/_english/main/vod.php – Reinventing Yeungnam
- http://www.yu.ac.kr/_english/about/index.php?c=about_09_list – Yeungnam University Campus Photo Gallery
