= Klec (Jindřichův Hradec District) =

- Municipality
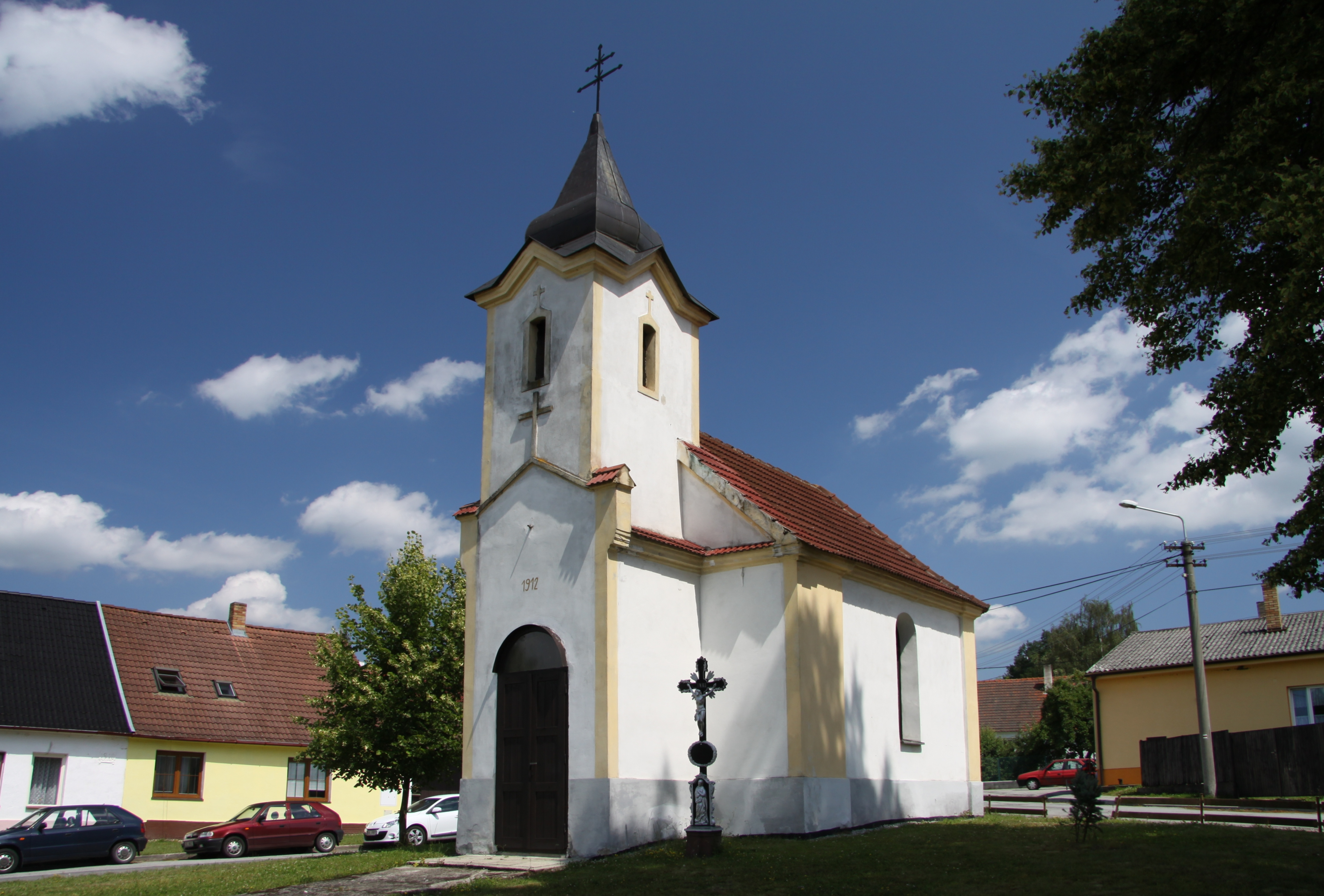
- Chapel in Klec

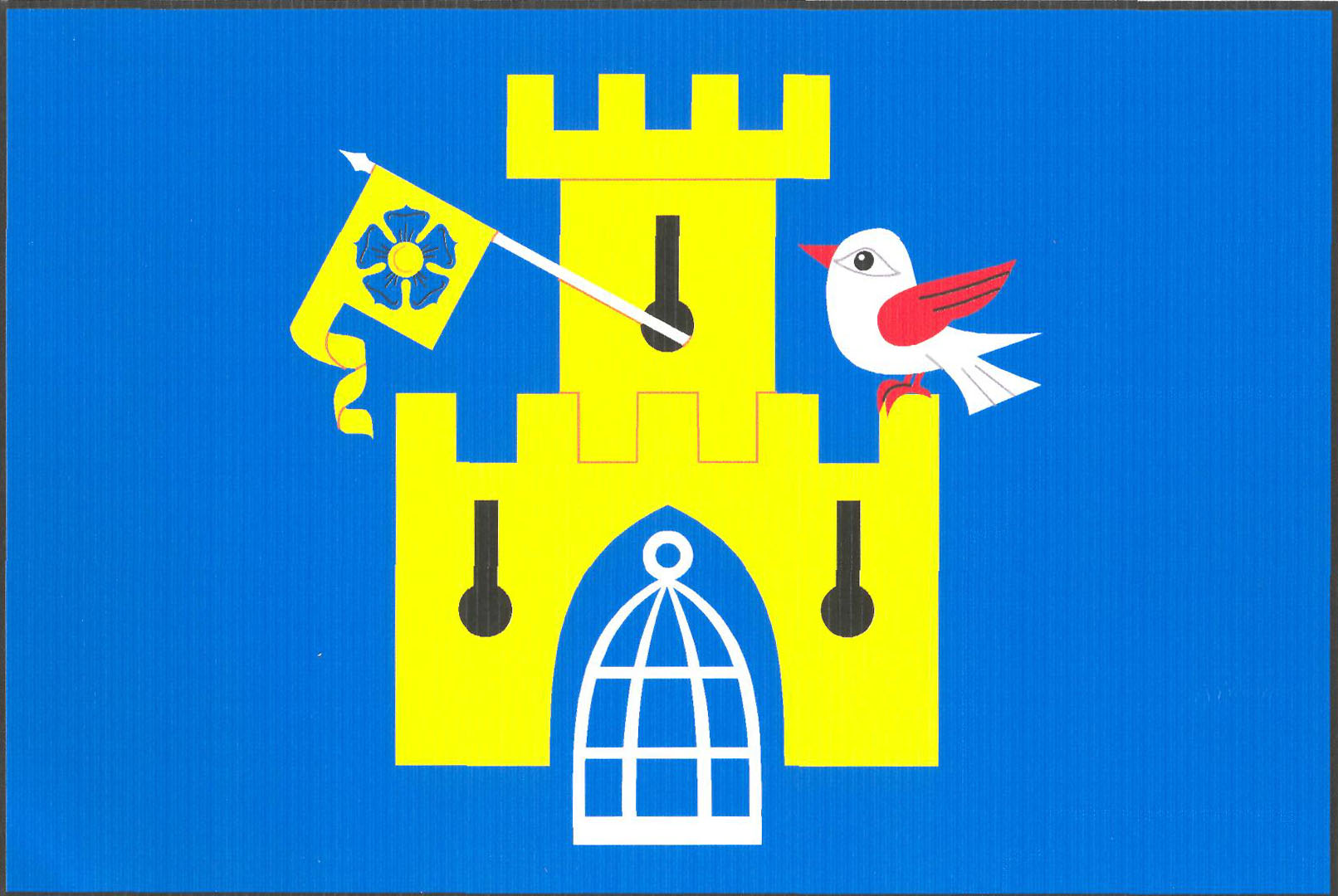
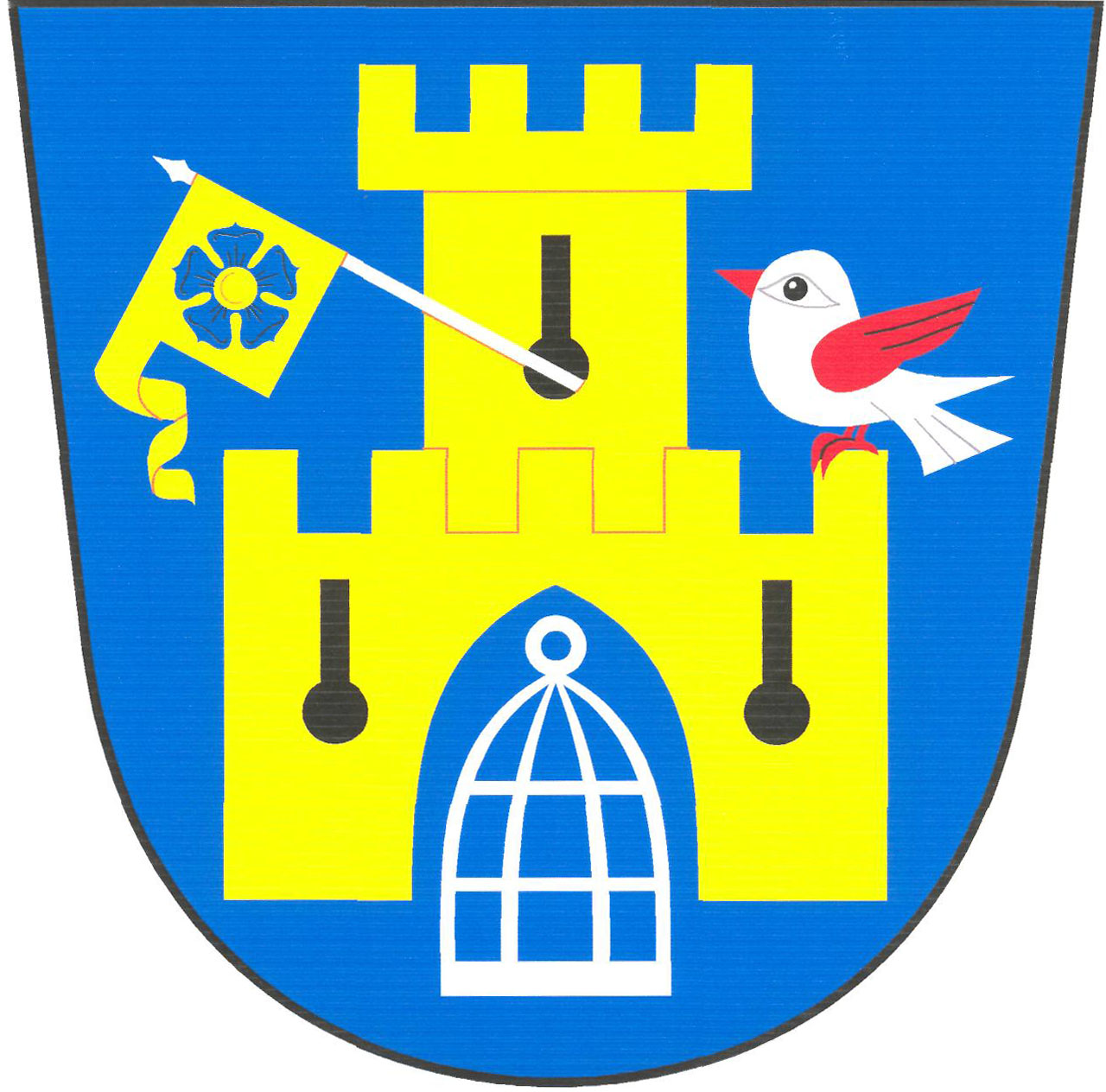
- Flag Coat of arms

- Location in the Czech Republic
- Coordinates: 49°5′59″N 14°44′53″E
- Country: Czech Republic
- Region: South Bohemian
- District: Jindřichův Hradec
- First mentioned: 1388

Area
  - Total: 6.32 km^{2} (2.44 sq mi)
- Elevation: 414 m (1,358 ft)

Population (2026-01-01)
  - Total: 154
  - Density: 24.4/km^{2} (63.1/sq mi)
- Time zone: UTC+1 (CET)
  - Summer (DST): UTC+2 (CEST)
- Postal code: 378 16
- Website: obecklec.cz

Klec is a municipality and village in Jindřichův Hradec District in the South Bohemian Region of the Czech Republic. It has about 200 inhabitants.

Klec lies approximately 19 kilometres (12 mi) west of Jindřichův Hradec, 25 km (16 mi) north-east of České Budějovice, and 113 km (70 mi) south of Prague.

== Demographics ==
Historical population
Year	Pop.	±%
1869	248	—
1880	307	+23.8%
1890	334	+8.8%
1900	303	−9.3%
1910	372	+22.8%
1921	349	−6.2%
1930	358	+2.6%
1950	260	−27.4%
1961	270	+3.8%
1970	280	+3.7%
1980	219	−21.8%
1991	184	−16.0%
2001	197	+7.1%
2011	164	−16.8%
2021	164	+0.0%
Source: Censuses
