= STARTALK (language program) =

STARTALK is a language education program created under the National Security Language Initiative, a federal program which seeks to expand the teaching of strategically important languages in the United States. Languages taught under the STARTALK program previously included Arabic, Chinese, Dari, Hindi, Korean, Persian, Portuguese, Russian, Swahili, Turkish, and Urdu. From 2006 until 2021, the STARTALK program was administered by the National Foreign Language Center of the University of Maryland, located in Riverdale, Maryland. In 2023 STARTALK narrowed its eligibility for funding to only Chinese and Russian.

== Closure ==
On April 30, 2025, the National Security Agency announced that the STARTALK program had been decommissioned. The program's online portal was subsequently taken offline, and remaining funded programs concluded their final cohorts.

== See also ==
- Language Resource Center
- Governor's Foreign Language Academies
