= Scholarships in Korea =

Scholarships in Korea are assistance programs aimed at helping students in or from South Korea pursue their education. Scholarships come in different forms based on factors such as the duration of study and the applicant's academic qualifications. They have various root aims, including recognizing academic achievement, promoting research and knowledge in specific fields, promoting global academic exchange, and reducing the financial burden on individuals.

Some Korean universities offer internal scholarships based on merit or on financial need. External scholarships are provided by companies such as Samsung, domestic and foreign governments, and private foundations, each with a different focus. The Korean Government Scholarship Program includes several programs like KGSPIS, KGSPSO, and support for foreign exchange students. The Korea Student Aid Foundation manages government-supported student aid programs. Some private foundations including the Korea Foundation and the Korea Research Foundation focus primarily on graduate-level scholarships, and the Korea Scholarship Foundation for Future Leaders has a focus on foreign graduate students from Asian, Latin-American, and African countries.

== Common goals of scholarship donors in Korea ==
Scholarship donors and foundations indicate a multitude of reasons as to why they started to offer their scholarship program for students in Korea, while certain goals are mentioned repeatedly throughout all scholarship descriptions:

- Awarding excellent students for their display of academic performance
- Furthering academic and practical research in Korea, especially in sciences and IT
- Supporting and developing rare talent in very specific or technical majors.
- Fostering exchange of academic scholars throughout Asia and the world
- Easing the burden of tuition on students and PhD candidates

== Differentiation of scholarships ==
The general availability, ease of accessibility and amount of funding (per stay and applicant) differs widely depends on the intended duration of study or research and the highest academic qualification of the applicant. Similar to other countries, scholarship applications for a short-term exchange (around six months) have the highest chance of success.

== Internal (University) Scholarships ==
Universities like Korea University, Yonsei University and Hanyang University have their own merit- and need-based scholarships for international students and scholars.

=== Korea University ===
Korea University offers a variety of circa 20 scholarships, of which five are solely based on "grade in admission", while for the rest of the scholarships, recipients are chosen by an "open selection" based on either merit or need or both.

The university also offers the "BK21" scholarship initiated by the Korean government. Its target applicants are IT majors in the graduate school, while another goal is the improvement of the faculty situation.

=== Sungkyunkwan University (SKKU) ===
Sungkyunkwan University provides several internal scholarship schemes for international students: Academic excellence scholarship and Sungkyunkwan Global Scholarship. Also, they provide government-funded scholarship such as BK21 scholarship and IBS scholarship.

== External Scholarships ==
Aside from university scholarships, there are also multinational companies like Samsung who have their own education aid schemes. The Korean government also has schemes like the NIIED, IITA and KRF scholarships. Finally there are private foundations who offer scholarships.

=== Service Center for International Students ===
Since July 2012 the NIIED offers a dedicated service center for international students ("외국인유학생상담센터") that provides various information regarding Korea and the scholarship programs that International Students can apply for.

=== Government scholarships ===
==== Global Korea Scholarship (GKS) ====
The "Global Korea Scholarship (GKS)" is an umbrella term to cover various scholarship and support programs to invite international students to Republic of Korea (South Korea), and support Korean students' study abroad. This is organised and operated by the 'National Institute for International Education (NIIED)', which is the educational governmental institute of Ministry of Education, Government of Republic of Korea. Further information is available at their two websites.

- Study in Korea:
- National Institute for International Education (NIIED):

All of below belong to the Global Korea Scholarship (GKS).

- The Korean Government Scholarship Program for International Students (KGSPIS)
- The Korean Government Scholarship Program for Study Overseas (KGSPSO)
- The Korean Government Invitation Program for Partner Countries
- The Korean Government Support Program for Foreign Exchange Students
- The Korean Government Support Program for Self-financed Students
- GKS for ASEAN countries' Science and Engineering Students
- GKS Summer Program for African and Latin American Students
- Korea-Japan Joint Higher Education Student Exchange Program

==== Korea Student Aid Foundation (KOSAF) ====
The Korea Student Aid Foundation (KOSAF) manages national government-supported student aid programs including need-based grants, merit-based scholarships and work-study programs. The Korea Student Aid Foundation was established by Korean law in the Act on the Establishment of the Korea Scholarship Foundation on May 7, 2009 (Act No. 9415 of February 6, 2009). KOSAF works closely together with the Ministry of Education. (MOE).

=== Company scholarships ===
==== Samsung scholarships ====
Samsung offers two different scholarships: First, the "Samsung Scholarship". Formerly known as "The Samsung Lee Kun Hee Scholarship Foundation", it was established in 2002. The Samsung Scholarship provides financial support, encouragement and opportunities to gifted Korean students pursuing higher education overseas. On the other hand, the company offers the Samsung Global Scholarship Program (Samsung GSP), which offers similar opportunities for talented international candidates interested in obtaining a Master of Science in Engineering or an MBA.

=== Scholarships of private foundations ===
Both the Korea Foundation (KF) and the Korea Research Foundation (KRF) offer scholarships to international and Korean students primarily on a graduate level. The Korea Foundation especially fosters students that major in subjects related to Korean language and culture, while the KRF puts a strong focus on sponsoring candidates interested in obtaining a scholarly career track, i.e. who are researching in the fields of Sciences and Engineering. But the KRF also offers special scholarships to Korean students with agricultural majors and selected undergraduate majors.

The Korea Scholarship Foundation for Future Leaders (KOSFFL, 한국지도자육성장학재단) provides scholarships to foreign graduate (i.e. Master's degree) students originating from Asian, Latin-American and African countries.

== Inbound scholarships for Korean nationals ==
As far as not listed above, there are scholarships not only for Korean nationals but also so-called "ethnic Koreans".

== Outbound scholarships for American citizens ==
Additionally to the described inbound scholarships for Koreans, there is a wide variety of outbound summer school, language course and study scholarships available for US citizens that want to go to Korea. The US government and private foundations offer such (short-term) stipends. This way interested and qualified US citizens can self-sustain their stay in Korea.

== Scholarships for students from Southeast Asian Nations ==
There are a lot of scholarships available for students from ASEAN nations compared to offers that cater to other nationalities. A majority of them is listed on the ASEAN University Network (AUN) website.

== Student loans in Korea ==
Loans, including student loans, are usually only available to Korean nationals or people with Korean citizenship. Government funded students loans are operated at a low interest rate by the Korea Student Aid Foundation (KOSAF) in the form of direct loan and income contingent loan. At this time, the KOSAF loans are available only for Korean citizens.
