= Korean Government Scholarship Program =

South Korean scholarship

The Korean Government Scholarship Program, or KGSP, is an academic scholarship funded and managed by the National Institute for International Education (NIIED), a branch of the Ministry of Education in South Korea. This scholarship provides non-Korean scholars (or overseas Koreans who fulfil certain criteria) with the funding and opportunity to conduct undergraduate or postgraduate level studies in South Korea after completing one year of intensive Korean language studies. Since its conception in 1967, over 3,000 students from 148 countries have successfully completed the scholarship program.

And another Korean Government Scholarship Program, Korea Student Aid Foundation or KOSAF is an executive quasi-governmental institution under the Ministry of Education that provides student funds to university students. It is a foundation created by the government to reduce the burden on university students even a little during the Lee Myung Bak administration, where half-price tuition demonstrations continued.

== Overview ==
The Korean Government Scholarship Program is designed to bring overseas talent to South Korea, and to integrate the scholars into Korean culture and society. If accepted, each scholar typically spends one year in South Korea learning the Korean language, followed by a 2–4 year university program, depending on their level of studies. In 2015, 820 students from 162 countries were accepted into the scholarship program. However, 270 scholars failed to obtain their degree in the years 2011–2015, citing language and cultural barriers.

Each scholar is provided financial support by the Korean government in the form of a monthly allowance. Undergraduate students receive 800,000 KRW a month whereas graduate students receive 1 000,000 KRW a month. In addition, NIIED provides airfare to student to and from their home country at the beginning and end of the program. Stipends and other allowances are also given to each scholar.

=== Language Program ===
Prior to starting their degree studies, KGSP scholars are required to take one year of intensive language studies at a designated language institute. All scholars are required to obtain at least level 3 (intermediate) in the Test of Proficiency in Korean (TOPIK) before they can continue to their degree studies. According to NIIED, TOPIK level 3 allows the individual to "perform basic linguistic functions necessary to use various public facilities and maintain social relationships."

The normal duration for the language program is one year, but it can be waived, shortened or extended depending on the scholar's TOPIK results. Scholars who have previously obtained a TOPIK level of 5 or 6 (advanced) are exempted from the language program, and are required to start their studies immediately. If a scholar obtains TOPIK 5 or 6 within the first six months of the language program, then they are required to start their studies at the beginning of the next semester, reducing their time at the language institute by six months. Additionally, scholars who fail to achieve TOPIK 3 after one year of language studies cannot proceed to their degree studies, and must do another six months of language study at their language institute. Students may not leave South Korea during the language program so that they may concentrate on their studies. However, exceptions are made in case of emergencies and family matters .

The language institute is designated by NIIED and cannot be changed. The language institutes include schools like Keimyung University and Dongseo University, and are typically in a different city than the school chosen for the degree program. This gives each scholar the opportunity to explore multiple cities within South Korea.

Those without a resident visa are required to have a D-4 visa to undergo language studies.

=== University Studies ===
During the application process, scholars choose a program and university for their degree program which cannot be changed, barring extreme circumstances. The scholarship program allocates four years for scholars pursuing their bachelor's degree, two years for a master's degree and three years for a PhD. The graduation requirements for each scholar is dependent on their program and university.

Scholars who have TOPIK level 5 or greater are granted an additional 100,000 KRW a month for their monthly allowance during their degree studies. Additional money is given to scholars in postgraduate research based fields.

Those without a resident visa are required to have a D-2 visa to undergo their studies.

== Participating Countries ==
As of 2014, citizens from 157 countries are able to apply for KGSP.

List of Countries with KGSP Quotas
Afghanistan	Albania	Algeria	Angola	Argentina	Armenia
Australia	Austria	Azerbaijan	Bahrain	Bangladesh	Barbados
Belarus	Belgium	Benin	Bhutan	Bolivia	Botswana
Brazil	Brunei	Bulgaria	Burkina Faso	Burundi	Cambodia
Cameroon	Canada	Central African Republic	Chile	China	Colombia
Costa Rica	Côte d'Ivoire	Croatia	Czech Republic	Democratic Republic of the Congo	Denmark
Djibouti	Dominica	Ecuador	Egypt	El Salvador	Equatorial Guinea
Estonia	Ethiopia	Fiji	Finland	France	Gabon
Gambia	Georgia	Germany	Ghana	Greece	Greenland
Guatemala	Guinea	Guinea-Bissau	Guyana	Haiti	Honduras
Hungary	India	Indonesia	Iran	Iraq	Ireland
Israel	Italy	Japan	Jordan	Kazakhstan	Kenya
Kuwait	Kyrgyzstan	Laos	Latvia	Lebanon	Lesotho
Liberia	Libya	Madagascar	Malawi	Malaysia	Mali
Mauritania	Mauritius	Mexico	Mongolia	Montenegro	Morocco
Mozambique	Myanmar	Namibia	Nepal	Netherlands	New Zealand
Nicaragua	Niger	Nigeria	Norway	Oman	Pakistan
Palestine	Panama	Papua New Guinea	Paraguay	Peru	Philippines
Poland	Portugal	Qatar	Republic of Seychelles	Republic of South Africa	Republic of the Congo
Romania	Russia	Rwanda	Sao Tome Principe	Saudi Arabia	Senegal
Serbia	Singapore	Slovakia	Slovenia	Solomon Islands	Somalia
Spain	Sri Lanka	Sudan	Suriname	Swaziland	Sweden
Switzerland	Syria	Taiwan	Tajikistan	Tanzania	Thailand
The Bahamas	The United Arab Emirates	The United Kingdom	The United States	Timor-Leste	Togo
Trinidad and Tobago	Tunisia	Turkey	Turkmenistan	Uganda	Ukraine
Uruguay	Uzbekistan	Venezuela	Vietnam	Yemen	Zambia
Zimbabwe

== Eligible Universities ==
As of 2014, 60 universities are designated by NIIED as eligible institutions for postgraduate degree studies.

List of KGSP Affiliated Universities in South Korea
Ajou University	Chonbuk National University	Chonnam National University
Chung-Ang University	Chungbuk National University	Chungnam National University
Daegu University	Daejeon University	Dong-a University
Dongguk University	Dongseo University	Ewha Womans University
Gangneung-Wonju National University	Gyeongsang National University	Hallym University
Handong Global University	Hankuk University of Foreign Studies	Hannam University
Hanyang University	Hongik University	Inha University
Inje University	Jeju National University	Jeonju University
Korea Advanced Institute of Science and Technology	Kangwon National University	KDI School of Public Policy and Management
Keimyung University	Kongju National University	Konkuk University
Kookmin University	Korea University	Korea University of Technology and Education
Kumoh National Institute of Technology	Kyonggi University	Kyunghee University
Kyungpook National University	Kyungsung University	Myongji University
Pai Chai University	Pohang University of Science and Technology	Pukyong National University
Pusan National University	Seoul National University of Science and Technology	Seoul National University
Sogang University	Sookmyung Women's University	Soonchunhyang University
Soongsil University	Sunchon National University	Sungkyunkwan University
Sunmoon University	The Graduate School of Korean Studies in the Academy of Korean Studies	Ulsan National Institute of Science and Technology
University of Science & Technology	University of Seoul	University of Ulsan
Woosong University	Yeungnam University	Yonsei University

== See also ==
- Scholarships in Korea
- Education in South Korea
