= Korean as a foreign language =

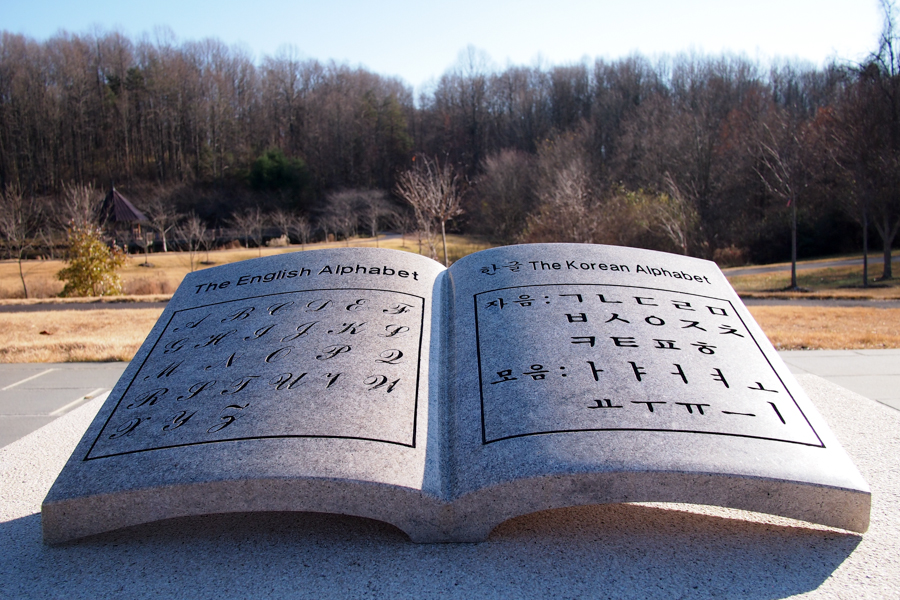
Korean Alphabet Hangul

Korean as a foreign language is the study of the Korean language by anyone who is not a native speaker, regardless of Korean ethnicity.

== International organizations ==
The International Association for Korean Language Education (IAKLE; Korean: 국제한국어교육학회), founded in 1985, is the world's largest organization of Korean language teachers, with over 1,200 members. Its first president was Fred Lukoff of the University of Washington.

== Government support ==
King Sejong Institute (Korean: 세종학당; RR: Sejong Hakdang) is the brand name of Korean-language institutes established by the South Korean government around the world since 2007. The institute's name refers to Sejong the Great, the inventor of the Korean alphabet. As of June 2021, there were 234 King Sejong Institutes in 82 countries.

== Testing ==
The Test of Proficiency in Korean (TOPIK; 한국어능력시험) was introduced by the South Korean government in 1997 and conducted by a branch of the Ministry of Education of the country. The test is offered six times annually (Jan, Apr, May, Jul, Oct, Nov) within South Korea and less often to people studying Korean in other countries. The test is for individuals whose first language is not Korean and is taken by overseas ethnic Koreans, those wishing to study at a Korean university, and for those who want to be employed at Korean companies in and outside of Korea. Since 2011, TOPIK is administered by the National Institute for International Education (NIIED; 국립국제교육원), a branch of the Ministry of Education in South Korea.

The Korean Language Ability Test, (KLAT; 세계한국말인증시험) is offered by the Korean Language Society and is a major alternative to Test of Proficiency in Korean (TOPIK).

== By country ==
=== Korea ===
University-level education includes:

- Yonsei University Korean Language Institute
- Myongji University Korean Language Institute
- Seoul National University Korean Language Education Center
- Sogang University Korean Language Education Center
- Busan University of Foreign Studies
- Language Education Institute of Pusan National University

=== United States ===
According to a 2019 report by the Modern Language Society, Korean is the 11th most studied language in U.S. colleges.

=== Russia ===
Korean is the third most popular foreign language in Russia. Russia has the fourth largest number of university-level Korean language and Korean studies classes and programs.

=== India ===
Korean is one of the most popular learning languages in India. For Indians aged 17 to 25, Korean ranked fifth on Duolingo's Most Popular Languages chart.

=== Vietnam ===
South Korea is the largest foreign investor, ranking second in development aid and third in trade with Vietnam. In 2021 and 2022 combined, 28,450 Vietnamese people took the TOPIK. Korean is the first foreign language selected by the Vietnamese education authorities and can be learned from the third grade of elementary school.

== See also ==
- International students in South Korea
- Korean Language Ability Test
- Test of Proficiency in Korean

== See also ==
- Japanese as a foreign language
- Chinese as a foreign language
