= Busan University of Foreign Studies =

University in Busan, South Korea

Coordinates: 35.2669°N 129.0796°E

- 부산외국어대학교
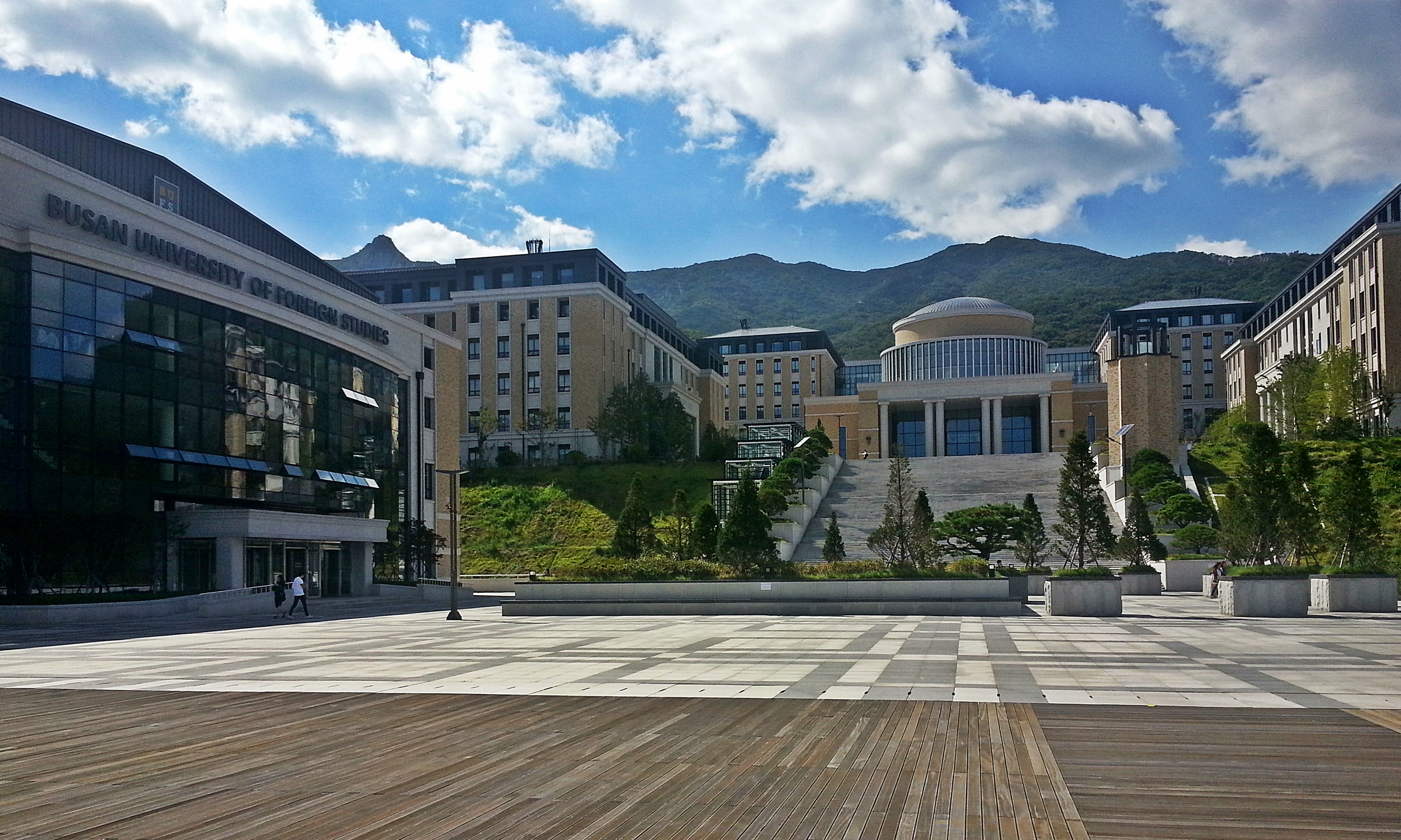
- Other name: Woe-Seong (외성)
- Motto: Faith (신의), Truth (진실), Creativity (창의)
- Type: Private
- Established: 1981
- President: Jeong Gi-yeong
- Faculty: 196
- Undergraduates: 9,532
- Location: Busan, South Korea
- Campus: Suburban
- Website: www.bufs.ac.kr
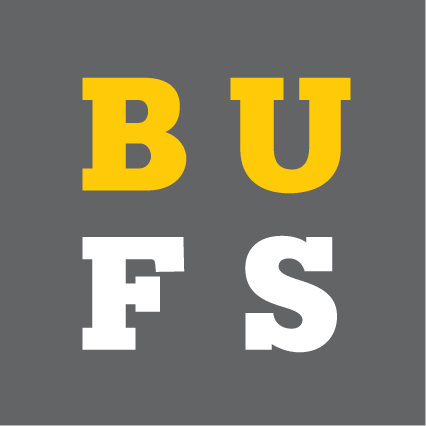

Korean name
- Hangul: 부산외국어대학교
- Hanja: 釜山外國語大學校
- RR: Busan oegugeo daehakgyo
- MR: Pusan oegugŏ taehakkyo

Busan University of Foreign Studies (Korean: 부산외국어대학교), often shortened to 부산외대 and BUFS, romanized as Busan University of Foreign Studies before 2011, is a private university in Busan, South Korea, which specializes in foreign languages. In 2014, following the completion of a new campus on the slope of Mount Geumjeongsan, the university moved to Namsan-dong.

== History ==
Busan University of Foreign Studies was founded in 1981 by the late Chung Tae-sung. His philosophy for education was that young intellectual minds must become leaders internationally. Busan University of Foreign Studies was founded as a college for studying foreign languages in April 1982 with its first students studying English, French, Japanese, Chinese, German, Indonesian, Malay, and Thai. Through the 1980s, the college expanded its programs and finally became a university in 1991. As of 2009, Busan University of Foreign Studies has academic exchange program agreements with 94 universities in 24 countries.

== Courses ==
BUFS consists of seven colleges, four graduate school programs, and nine research institutes. The language portion of the school is structured in three of the colleges: College of English, Japanese, and Chinese, College of Occidental Studies, and College of Oriental Studies. Other Western languages that the university offers are Italian, Spanish, Portuguese, and Russian. Eastern languages in addition to Japanese and Chinese include Vietnamese, Burmese, Hindi, Arabic, Turkish, and Uzbek.

The university also provides programs of study in international studies, Korean as a foreign language and literature, international law, international business, and IT.

== Colleges ==
In early 2020 soon after the admission of that year's freshmen, the school administration announced a significant change in the number of admission in multiple departments. This included the entire cease in the admission of some majors such as the Department of Paideia for Creative Leadership (which had had one of the highest levels of competition and had been considered the most valuable major), effectively closing down those majors. New majors were created in their places such as the Department of Counseling Psychology and the Department of Airline Service Management.

Soon after the announcement, the school administration received major backlash from multiple student bodies, and a conference took place between heads of school administrative departments and members of the student councils. The major point of complaint from the students was that the announcement was given without any warning, leaving the freshmen feeling as though they were tricked into entering a university where their major wouldn't exist straight after graduation. Despite the students' questions about the ethics of the university's conduct, the conference ended with the university administrators insisting on financial inviability and population decline to justify their decisions(The point of population decline was quickly pointed out by one of the students as being deceptive due to the total number of students remaining the same in the university's plans). This major shift in the structure of the BUFS curriculum reaffirmed a preexisting negative notion of apathy of the university administration for student welfare and furthered the criticism that the university is in the process of losing its identity of specializing in languages and foreign studies by prioritizing trend and profit.

- College of English, Chinese and Japanese Studies
  - Division of English
    - Major in English for Tourism and Convention
    - Major in English for Communication, Interpretation and Translation
    - Major in British & American Literature and Culture Contents
    - Major in English for IT
  - Division of Japanese Communication
    - Major in Japanese Interpretation and Translation
    - Major in Japanese Language and Literature
  - Division of Japanese Business
    - Major in Japanese in Hotel and Tourism
    - Major in Japanese in Business and IT
  - Division of Chinese
    - Major in Chinese Interpretation and Translation
    - Major in Chinese Language and Culture
- College of Occidental Studies
  - Department of French
  - Department of German
  - Department of Spanish
  - Department of Portuguese
  - Department of Russian
  - Department of Italian
  - Department of Commercial Relations in the EU
- College of Oriental Studies
  - Department of Thai
  - Department of Indonesia-Malaysia
  - Department of Arabic
  - Department of India
  - Department of Vietnamese
  - Department of Myanmar
  - Department of Turkish and Central Asian Languages (Kazakh, Uzbek)
  - Department of Commercial Relations in China
- Institute for Mediterranean Studies
- College of Humanities and Social Sciences
  - Department of Paideia for Creative Leadership (Liberal Arts/ Global Dual Degree Program) (Stopped admission since 2020)
  - Division of Korean Language & Literature
    - Major in Korean Literature
    - Major in Korean Education as a Foreign Language
    - Major in Korean Language and Literature for Foreigners
  - Department of Visual Media
  - Department of History and Tourism
  - Division of Law and Police
    - Major in Law
    - Major in Police
  - Department of International Relations
  - Department of Social Welfare
- College of Commerce
  - Division of Business Administration
    - Major in International Management
    - Major in Service Management
  - Department of International Trade
  - Department of Data management
  - Division of Accounting and Taxation
    - Major in Accounting and Money Business
    - Major in Taxation
  - Department of Economics
  - Department of e-Business
  - Department of International Secretarial [Administrative] Studies
  - Division of Russian & Indian Business Studies
    - Major in Russian Business and Area Studies
    - Major in Indian Business and Area Studies
- College of Natural Science
  - Department of Information Mathematics
  - Department of Computer Engineering
  - Division of Digital Media Engineering
    - Major in Multi-Media
    - Major in Information Communication
  - Department of Embedded IT
  - Division of Sports and Leisure Studies
    - Major in Sport for All
    - Major in Sport Management
    - Major in Golf

== Notable alumni ==
- Usun Yoon, actress
- Jun Woul-sik, badminton player

== Accident ==
- Gyeongju Mauna Ocean Resort collapse
