= King Sejong Institute =

South Korean cultural promotion organization

King Sejong Institute Foundation
- Founded: 2007
- Founder: Government of South Korea
- Type: Cultural promotion organization
- Region served: Worldwide
- Product: Korean language education
- Website: Official Website

The King Sejong Institute Foundation (Korean: 세종학당재단; Hanja: 世宗學堂財團; RR: Sejong Hakdang Jaedan) is a foundation established by the South Korean government that encourages learning of the Korean language around the world. It was founded in 2007. Its name refers to Sejong the Great, the inventor of the Korean alphabet. As of February 2024, there were 248 King Sejong institutes in 85 countries.

== Background ==
=== Early Korean language teaching ===
Hangul, the Korean alphabet, is the written form of the official Korean language and has been used by Koreans since its creation in 1446 by Sejong the Great of the Joseon Dynasty. Most Korean language learning institutions outside Korea targeted second or third generation descendants of Korean immigrants, while Korean-language learners in South Korea were mostly foreign students, migrant workers, or spouses of Koreans.

=== Rising numbers of Korean learners ===
The last twenty years has seen a rise in interest and demand for the Korean language due to cultural and commercial globalisation and the Internet/Communications Revolution. International interest in Korean culture such as dramas and music has increased tremendously, especially in Asia, leading to what has been termed the "Korean Wave". This has been accompanied by an increase in foreign students studying in Korea. Demographically there has also been an increase in marriages between Koreans and foreigners.

With the increase in international cooperation and business, the South Korean government has been striving to standardize the names of locations, people, and other proper nouns in Hangul. Also, there was a need for more up-to-date Korean dictionaries, as most were made during the 1990s.

=== Establishment of "King Sejong Institute" ===
With such demand, the South Korean government established the concept of "King Sejong Institute" so as to provide integrated and standardised information and service for learning the Korean language as well as to coordinate and expand the institutes where people can learn or teach it. The Institute will be developed as the brand commonly used by all Korean language education institutes. The South Korean government has recently launched its homepage at Sejonghakdang.org in Korean and English. Following enactment of Framework Act on National Language in 2011, the King Sejong Institute Foundation (KSIF) was founded in the following year as a central organisation responsible for running the Institutes and their programmes. Song Hyang-keun served as the first president of KSIF from October 2012 to July 2018 and Kang Hyounhwa serves its second president from September 2018.

== Logo ==
The King Sejong Institute is represented by a logo featuring the hangul initials ㅅ and ㅎ, which stand for Sejong Hakdang (세종학당), the Institute's name in Korean. The main shape resembles the letter ㅎ, representing Hakdang, with ㅅ positioned on the upper-left side to signify Sejong and complete the abbreviation.

== Activities ==
=== Integration and expansion of Hangul Institutes ===
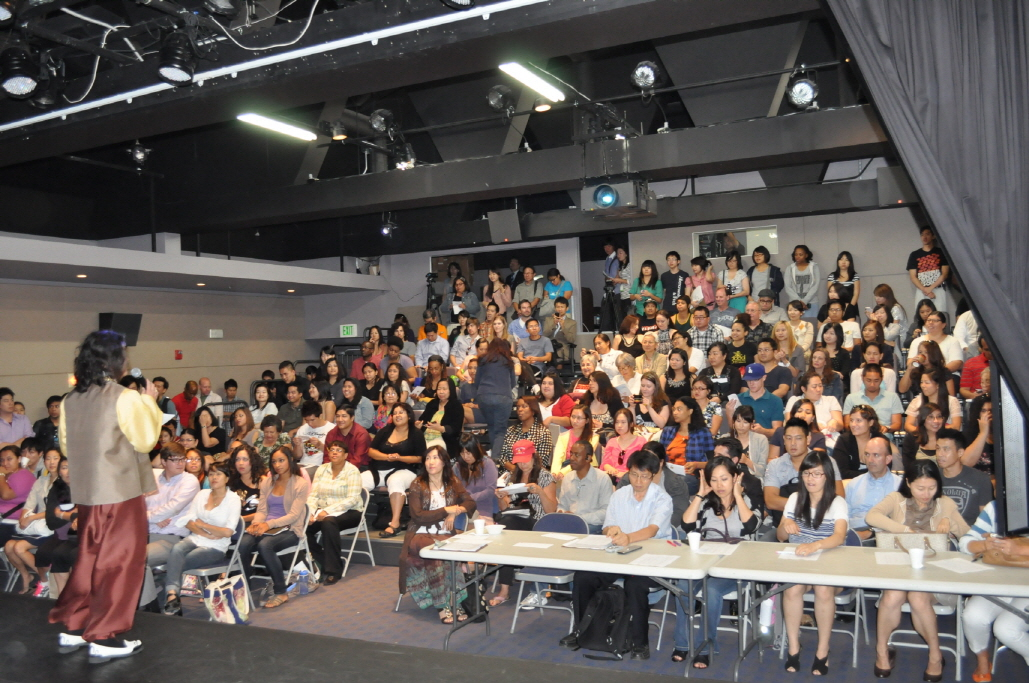
Annual Korean Singing Contest held at the Los Angeles King Sejong Institute (2011)

The South Korean government integrated the Korean Language Institutes being called with various names into one King Sejong Institute. For a short-term strategy, the government is to encourage to use the name "Sejong Hakdang" (King Sejong Institute) and the standard textbook and course, while reviewing a long-term strategy to run an integrated language institute.

144 institutes have been established by the year 2016. Nine more institutes have been newly established in countries such as Latvia, Myanmar, and Bahrain. In 2018, a new institute was added in the United States in Irvine, California at Korean American Center. The King Sejong Institute headquarters office was established in 2012 to systematically support the institutes around the world. The office works to be the focal point that connects the institutes around the world.

=== Nuri-Sejonghakdang ===
Nuri-Sejonghakdang is a website providing a remote education system and integrated information service related to Korean language study for Hangul learners and teachers. It is a Korean study website built jointly by various ministries within the South Korean government, including the Ministry of Culture, Sports and Tourism, Ministry of Education, Science, and Technology, Ministry of Foreign Affairs and Trade, Ministry of Health and Welfare, Ministry of Justice, and National Institute of the Korean Language, National Institute for International Education, The Overseas Koreans Foundation and International Korean Language Foundation with Presidential Council on Nation Branding as the main contributor.

Nuri-Sejonghakdang followed a three-step plan from 2009 to 2011 as below.

	Integration (2009)	Expansion (2010)	Spreading (2011)
System	Education integrated website; Study system; Teacher education system; Phone learning management system	Proficiency diagnosis system; Study support tool software; Teacher qualification support system	School administrative support system by institutes of Sejonghakdang; Production/sharing system of user created contents for Korean language learners; Service platform by service media (IPTV, mobile devices, etc.)
Contents	Collection and uploading Korean languages education contents	Create questions for Korean language diagnosis/qualification/test; Develop a Korean language teacher training education course; Develop education contents by level of Korean language/language area	Develop converted Korean language education contents by service media (IPTV, mobile devices, etc.)
Operating Environment	Build operating environment for Korean language education integrated system	Build telephone consulting center environment; Secure operating/consulting manpower; Secure/operate teachers for Korean language telephone learning	Secure Korean language telephone service teachers; Build operating environment by service media (IPTV, mobile devices, etc.)

Nuri-Sejonghakdang provides its services to Korean language institutes throughout the world, foreigners who wish to learn the Korean language, and teachers and future teachers of the Korean language. It is still collecting and developing its contents to expand the online study courses and building multi-language versions of the website for users all around the world. The multi-language version is completed.

== Locations ==
As of February 2024, there were 248 institutions established in 85 countries around the world.

=== Asia ===
- Azerbaijan 2 (Baku and Khirdalan)
- Armenia 1 (Yerevan)
- Bahrain 1 (Manama)
- Bangladesh (Dhaka)
- Cambodia 2 (Poipet and Siem Reap)
- China 19 (Beijing, Chengdu, Dalian, Hangzhou, Harbin, Hong Kong, Kunming, Linyi, Qingdao, Qiqihar, Shanghai, Shijiazhuang, Wenzhou, Wuhan, Xi'an, Yanbian, Yancheng and Yantai)
- Georgia 2 (Tbilisi)
- India 8 (Barasat, Bengaluru, Chennai 1, Imphal, New Delhi, Patna and Chennai 2
- Indonesia 7 (Bandung, Jakarta, Surabaya, Tangerang and Yogyakarta)
- Japan 16 (Chiba, Fukuoka, Hiroshima, Kanagawa, Kobe, Kyoto, Okayama, Osaka, Nagano, Nara, Saitama, Sapporo, Sendai, Shimonoseki and Tokyo)
- Jordan 1 (Amman)
- Kazakhstan 3 (Almaty, Astana and Shymkent)
- Kyrgyzstan 5 (Bishkek, Osh and Sokuluk)
- Laos 2 (Phonsavan and Vientian)
- Malaysia 3 (Bangi, Kuala Lumpur and Melaka)
- Mongolia 4 (Darkhan and Ulaanbaatar)
- Myanmar 1 (Yangon)
- Nepal 1 (Kathmandu)
- Pakistan 1 (Islamabad)
- Saudi Arabia 1 (Riyadh)
- Palestine 1 (Ramallah)
- Philippines 9 (Balanga, Cainta, Cebu City, Quezon City, Quezon City 2, San Juan, Muñoz, Iloilo City, and Taguig)
- Sri Lanka 2 (Colombo and Kandy)
- Taiwan 3 (Kaoshiung, Tainan and Taipei)
- Tajikistan 1 (Dushanbe)
- Thailand 5 (Bangkok, Chiang Mai and Maha Sarakham)
- Turkmenistan 1 (Ashgabat)
- United Arab Emirates 2 (Abu Dhabi, Ajman and Dubai)
- Uzbekistan 7 (Denau, Ferghana, Namangan, Samarkand and Tashkent)
- Vietnam 22 (Biên Hòa, Binh Duong, Cần Thơ, Da Lat, Da Nang, Haiphong, Hanoi, Ho Chi Minh City, Huế, Hưng Yên, Quy Nhơn, Thái Nguyên and Trà Vinh)

=== Africa ===
- Algeria 1 (Algiers)
- Botswana 1 (Gaborone)
- Egypt 3 (Alexandria, Cairo)
- Eswatini 1 (Mbabane)
- Ethiopia 1 (Addis Ababa)
- Ivory Coast 1 (Abidjan)
- Kenya 1 (Nairobi)
- Madagascar 2 (Toamasina, Antananarivo,)
- Morocco 2 (Rabat and Fez)
- Nigeria 1 (Abuja)
- South Africa 1 (Pretoria)
- Tanzania 1 (Dar es Salaam)
- Tunisia 1 (Ariana)
- Uganda 1 (Kumi)

=== Americas ===
- Argentina 2 (Buenos Aires)
- Brazil 5 (Brasília, Campinas, São Leopoldo and São Paulo)
- Bolivia 1 (La Paz)
- Canada 3 (Montreal, Ottawa and Waterloo)
- Chile 2 (Santiago)
- Colombia 1 (Bogotá)
- Costa Rica 1 (San José)
- Cuba 1 (Havana)
- Ecuador 1 ( Quito)
- El Salvador 1 (San Salvador)
- Guatemala 1 (Guatemala City)
- Haiti 1 (Caracol)
- Mexico 2 (Mexico City, Santiago de Querétaro)
- Paraguay 1 (Asunción)
- Peru 1 (Lima)
- United States 14 (Auburn, Bloomington, Chicago, Houston, Iowa City, Irvine, Los Angeles, San Antonio, San Francisco, Upland, Valdosta and Washington, D.C.)
- Uruguay 1 (Montevideo)

=== Europe ===
- Austria 1 (Vienna)
- Belarus 1 (Minsk)
- Belgium 2 (Brussels)
- Bulgaria 1 (Sofia)
- Croatia 3 (Zagreb, Split and Rijeka)
- Czech Republic 1 (Olomouc)
- Denmark 1 (Copenhagen)
- Estonia 1 (Tallinn)
- Finland 1 (Tampere) – Tampere KSI is Finland's first and only official King Sejong Institute, offering structured Korean language education and cultural immersion in the heart of Tampere, operated by IWK.
- France 4 (La Rochelle, Paris and Quimper)
- Germany 6 (Berlin, Regensburg, Bonn, Würzburg and Tübingen)
- Greece 1 (Thessaloniki)
- Hungary 4 (2 in Budapest, 1-1 in Miskolc and Debrecen)
- Iceland 1 (Rejkjavik)
- Italy 2 (Rome, Turin)
- Latvia 1 (Riga)
- Lithuania 2 (Kaunas and Vilnius)
- Luxembourg 1 (Luxembourg)
- Poland 3 (Poznań, Warsaw and Katowice)
- Portugal 1 (Lisbon)
- Romania 1 (Bucharest)
- Russia 7 ( Khabarovsk, Moscow, Rostov-on-Don, Saint Petersburg, Ulan-Ude, Vladivostok and Yuzhno-Sakhalinsk)
- Serbia 1 (Novi Sad)
- Slovakia 1 (Bratislava)
- Slovenia 1 (Ljubljana)
- Spain 3 (Barcelona, Las Palmas and Madrid)
- Sweden 3 (2 in Gothenburg, 1 in Stockholm)
- Turkey 4 (2 in Ankara,1-1 in Rize, Istanbul)
- Ukraine 1 (Dnipro)
- United Kingdom 4 (London and Preston)

=== Oceania ===
- Australia 4 (Adelaide, 2 in Sydney, Perth )
- New Zealand 1 (Auckland)

== See also ==
- Korean language
- Korean as a foreign language
