= Fulbright Commission Belgium =

The Commission for Educational Exchange between the United States of America, Belgium, and Luxembourg is located in Brussels, Belgium, with the office situated at the Royal Library Albert I. It is a not-for profit organization that is responsible for administering Fulbright grants for citizens of Belgium and Luxembourg. It also serves as the EducationUSA Advising Center in Belgium.

== Fulbright Program ==
The Fulbright Program is the flagship international educational exchange program sponsored by the United States State Department. It was created with legislation introduced by U.S. Senator J. William Fulbright in 1946. The goal of the program is to increase a mutual understanding and cultural awareness between students and researchers in the United States and those abroad. To administer the program, bi-national Fulbright commissions were established in each partner country (e.g. Fulbright Austria, Franco-American Fulbright Commission, etc.).

== Fulbright Program in Belgium and Luxembourg ==
The Fulbright Commission in Belgium, established in 1948, administers several scholarship programs for citizens of Belgium and Luxembourg. Grants are available for graduate studies, pre- and post-doctoral research, or university lecturing in the United States. American citizens may also receive grants through the Fulbright Commission to study, conduct research, or teach in Belgium and Luxembourg. The program is co-funded by the U.S. Department of State, the Belgian Science Policy Office, and the Luxembourgish Ministry of Higher Education.

The Commission offers approximately 25 scholarships per year for study, teaching, and research to citizens of Belgium and Luxembourg. Approximately 20 grants are also available for U.S. citizens for study, teaching, or research in Belgium or Luxembourg. Special scholarships for study in business, law, science, technology, engineering, and journalism are also available. Candidates for the Commission's grants to the United States must hold a post-secondary degree and have achieved outstanding results. Candidates' for the Commission's grants to Belgium or Luxembourg must be American citizens and cannot be living in Belgium or Luxembourg at the time of their application.

Notable alumni of the Fulbright Program in Belgium and Luxembourg include:

- Alexander De Croo, Prime Minister of Belgium
- Luc Frieden, Prime Minister of Luxembourg
- Athlete Josy Barthel
- Politician Alexia Bertrand
- Politician Samuel Cogolati
- Bernand Coulie, Former Rector of UC Louvain
- Politician Benjamin Dalle
- Politician Herman De Croo
- François-Xavier de Donnea, Former Minister-President of the Brussels Capital Region
- Economist Paul De Grauwe
- Economist Jan-Emmanuel De Neve
- Petra De Sutter, Deputy Prime Minister of Belgium
- Luxembourgish politician Jean Hamilius
- President of the European Court of Justice Koen Lenaerts
- American religious scholar Ralph McInerny
- Pulitzer Prize winner Katherine Anne Porter
- Linguist Curt Rice
- Pulitzer Prize winner Ernest Samuels
- Pianist Liebrecht Vanbeckevoort
- Journalist Peter Vandermeersch
- Belgian diplomat Johan Verbeke
- Melchior Wathelet, Former Minister President of Wallonia
- Pierre Wunsch, Governor of the National Bank of Belgium

=== Fulbright Schuman Program ===
Since 1990, the Fulbright Commission in Brussels has also administered the Fulbright Schuman Program. The program grants scholarships for scholars to conduct research and/or study (at the post-graduate level) in topics related to European Union affairs or U.S.-EU relations. The program is open to citizens of all 27 European Union member states as well as American citizens with two years of relevant experience. The program is co-funded by the United States State Department and the Directorate-General for Education and Culture of the European Commission.

Notable alumni of the Fulbright Schuman Program include American economist Austan Goolsbee, British scholar Ian Holliday, and Portuguese academic and politician Miguel Poiares Maduro.

== EducationUSA Advising Center ==
The Commission also hosts the EducationUSA Advising Center in Brussels. The Advising Center is one of a network of over 450 centers around the world. The mission of EducationUSA is to actively promote U.S. higher education throughout the world. EducationUSA Advising Centers offer complete, unbiased, accurate, and timely information about educational institutions and opportunities in the United States as well as guidance to qualified students as to how best access those opportunities. Each year millions of students and parents access the services of EducationUSA.

The Advising Center in Brussels, Belgium also offers information to U.S. higher education institutions who are looking to expand their international education offerings through student recruitment or expansion of study abroad, exchange, and internship programs.

The Commission’s Educational Advising Center is open to people of all nationalities living or working in Europe. The Center provides information about the full range of accredited U.S. higher education institutions. Advice is available for students seeking admission to secondary, undergraduate or graduate level studies as well as professional programs and intensive English courses. Materials from U.S. institutions as well as guide books that help prospective students understand the American higher education system, admissions requirements, application procedures and financial aid options are available at the Commission. The Advising Center also provides a weekly newsletter that gives information to those searching about scholarship, grants, and other opportunities that European students may be interested in during their search for higher education in the United States. While the primary focus is American higher education, some information about primary and secondary education, youth exchange programs and internships are also available.

Some of the services available at the Advising Center are:

- Details and application forms for Fulbright Scholarships
- Advice and information about Undergraduate, Graduate, and professional studies
- Assistance with selecting institutions, preparing applications, writing personal statements, and preparing for departure to the U.S.
- Certification of translations of academic documents needed for admission
- Registration information for standardized admissions tests, including the TOEFL, IELTS, GRE, SAT, and GMAT
- Preparation materials and practice books for admissions tests
- Reference guides for finding English language programs across the United States
- Lists of organizations that offer youth exchange programs and internship opportunities
- General information about obtaining student and scholar visas to the United States. Note: All formal visa applications are processed by the Consular Section of the United States Embassy to Belgium

== Events ==
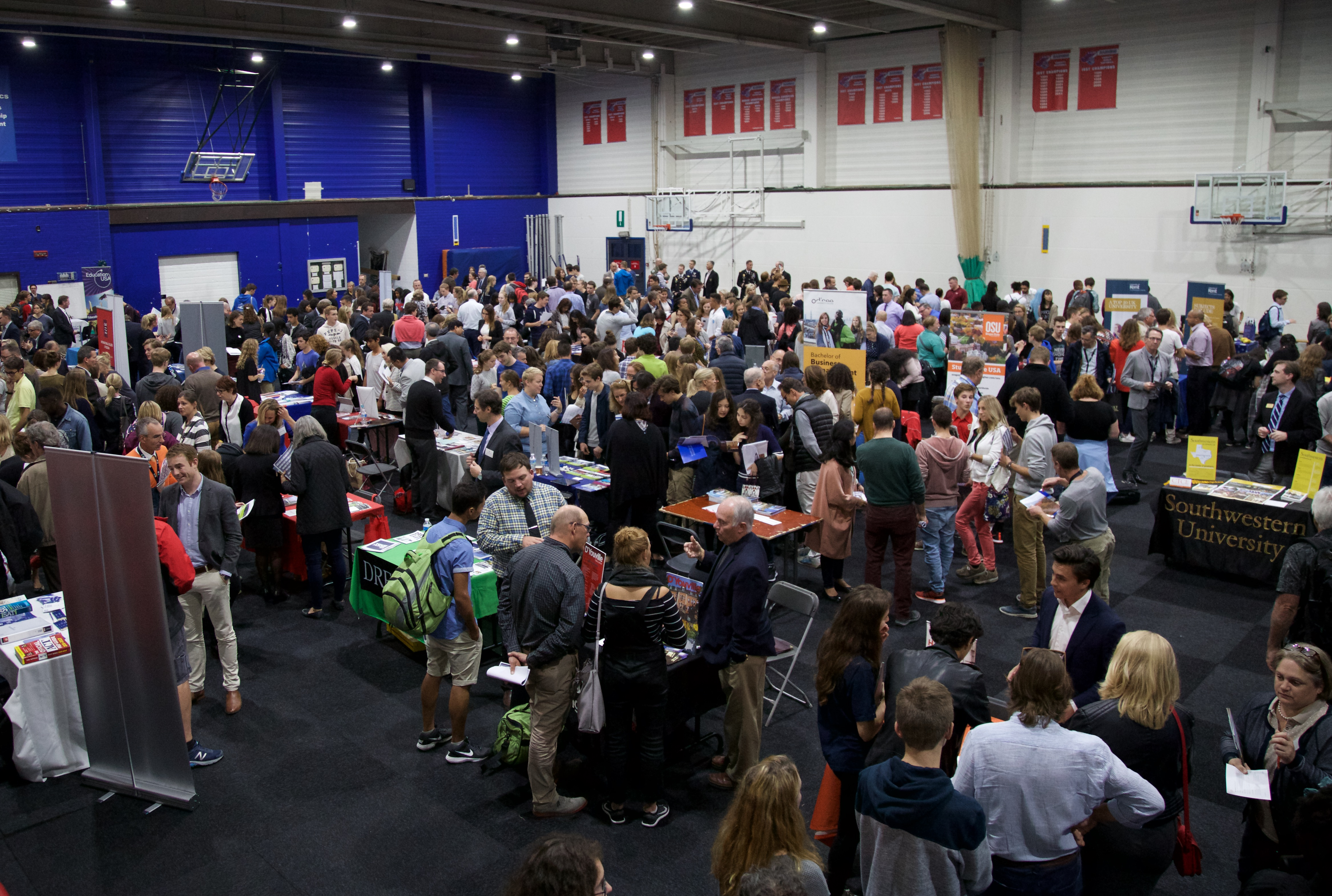
Students and families speak to representatives at Brussels College Night 2016.

The Commission's advising center is also responsible for coordinating, organizing and sponsoring various events throughout the year to provide more information to students on how to go about applying for universities and colleges in the United States. Since 1984, the Commission has coordinated Brussels College Night, the largest U.S.-focused college fair in Belgium. This annual event welcomes representatives from American colleges and universities as well as other institutions of higher learning.

More information about the Commission, applying to schools in the U.S., different degree programs, and specific schools is available via educational videos on the Commission’s Youtube channel. The Belgium Commission can also be found on Facebook, LinkedIn, Flickr, and Twitter.
