= NYU Paris =

Academic centre of New York University located in Paris, France

Coordinates: 48.8503°N 2.3469°E

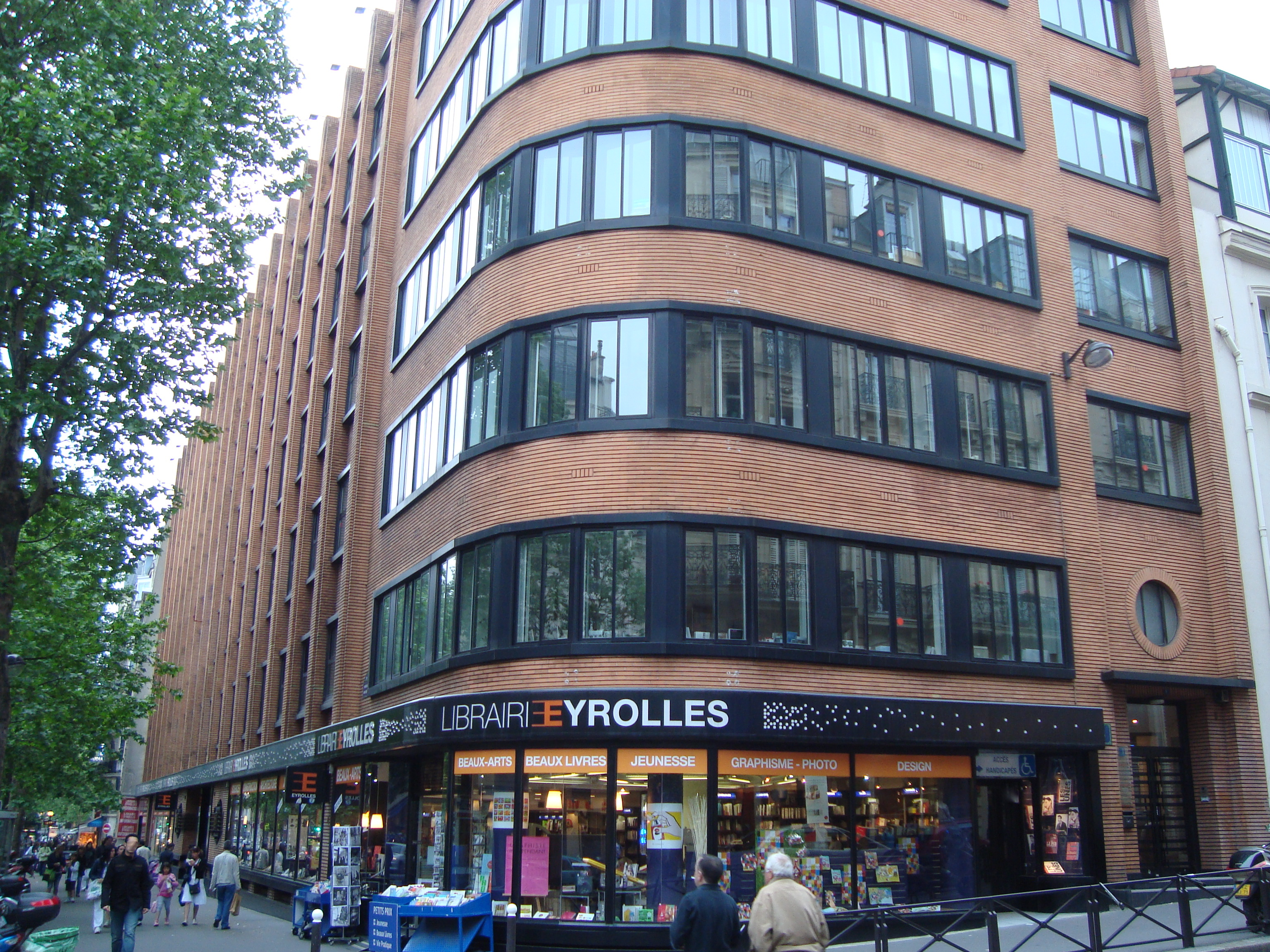
- Motto: Perstare Et Praestare
- Type: Private
- Established: 1969
- Location: Paris, France
- Colors: Mayfair Violet
- Website: www.nyu.edu/paris

NYU Paris is an academic centre of New York University located in Paris, France. It is one of NYU's 14 global academic centers, hosting around 250 students each semester with classes taught by around 50 professors.

== Campus ==
NYU Paris's campus is situated in the former facilities of the École spéciale des travaux publics at 57 boulevard Saint-Germain in the Latin Quarter of the 5th arrondissement, which were purchased by NYU in 2014.

The eight-floor campus is shared with Librairie Eyrolles, one of the largest specialized bookshops in Paris. It also hosts the NYU Paris Library and an auditorium.

=== Campus History ===
New York University first established a campus in Paris in September 1969, installing a small group of students and faculty in the offices of the Franco-American Fulbright Commission at 9 rue Chardin in the 16th arrondissement. Seeking more spacious facilities, the campus subsequently moved to the top floor of the France-Amériques centre on the avenue Franklin D. Roosevelt in the 8th arrondissement. In 1974 the university acquired a standalone house at 56 rue de Passy, leased from the family of philosopher Jean-Marie Benoist.

== Academic programs ==
NYU Paris hosts students from New York University's three degree-granting campuses in New York City, Abu Dhabi, and Shanghai, as well as study-abroad students from its partner universities in the United States. It offers courses in a variety of domains, many of which are documented below.

NYU Paris courses are conducted in partnership with the faculties and schools of New York University in New York City. Students may also take courses in the University of Paris system and at Sciences Po.

=== French Language and Literature ===
NYU Paris offers fifteen courses on the French language (ranging from elementary French to more advanced topics) as well as nine courses on French literature, thought and culture.

The NYU Department of French offers five distinct master's degree programs at NYU Paris.

=== Humanities and Social Sciences ===
NYU Paris offers courses in anthropology, history, philosophy, politics, linguistics, psychology as well as European and Mediterranean studies.

=== Law ===
NYU Paris hosts the New York University School of Law program in European law.

=== Liberal Arts ===
NYU Paris provides courses in Art, Art History, Cinema Studies as well as Media, Culture and Communication. Select first-year students in the NYU Liberal Studies core program and Global Liberal Studies program may spend their first year of studies at NYU Paris rather than at NYU's campus in New York City.

=== Mathematics and Computer Science ===
As of 2018, NYU Paris began offering courses in computer science and mathematics, with a larger expansion in science courses planned for future semesters.

=== Music and Performing Arts ===
NYU Paris hosts a comprehensive music program that includes courses on music history, music theory, aural comprehension in music, keyboard skills, jazz ensembles, chamber ensembles and sound spatialization/synthesis/computer-aided composition.

NYU Paris also offers private lessons in piano, string instruments, music composition, wind or percussion instruments as well as vocal training.
