= Franco-American Fulbright Commission =

- Commission Fulbright franco-américaine

Bi-national commission overview
- Headquarters: 9 rue Chardin, Paris
- Parent department: Bureau of Educational and Cultural Affairs, US Department of State; French Foreign Ministry

The Franco-American Fulbright Commission (officially, the Commission franco-américaine d'échanges universitaires et culturels) is a bi-national commission established between the United States of America and the French Republic by the Fulbright-Hays Act of 1961 (P.L. 87-256) and the Franco-American Treaty of May 7, 1965. The Commission administers the Fulbright Program in France and operates the US State Department's EducationUSA advising center for France.

== Fulbright Grants ==
Pursuant to the Fulbright Act of 1946 and the Fulbright-Hays Act of 1961, the Franco-American Fulbright Commission awards Fulbright grants to US citizens to study in France and to French citizens to study in the United States.

== EducationUSA Advising Center ==
The EducationUSA center advises French citizens who intend to study at universities in the United States. The center promotes US universities as part of the public diplomacy of the United States.

== See also ==
- Commission for Educational Exchange between the United States of America, Belgium, and Luxembourg
- Austrian-American Educational Commission
