= A Community of Resistance =

Political book about Hong Kong by Ma Ngok

- Author: Ma Ngok
- Original title: 反抗的共同體：二〇一九香港反送中運動
- Language: Chinese
- Genre: Non-fiction
- Publisher: Rive Gauche Publishing House
- Publication date: October 2020; Taiwan
- ISBN: 9789869865685

A Community of Resistance: 2019 Hong Kong Anti-Extradition Movement is a book written by Ma Ngok and published in 2020 by Rive Gauche Publishing House. Focusing on the movement against the extradition bill, it recounts its background, course, strategies, the Hong Kong government's response, international reactions, the identity of Hong Kong residents and their interaction with the movement.

== Background ==
As of 2020, Ma Ngok is an associate professor in the Department of Government and Public Administration at the Chinese University of Hong Kong, having studied Hong Kong politics for almost 30 years. He began writing A Community of Resistance in August 2019 to document the anti–Extradition Bill movement, sometimes composing sections after watching live broadcasts of the protests. He chose to write a book rather than submit to English-language journals for several reasons: academic journals tend to require a narrow focus rather than a comprehensive account of the movement, and they impose word limits—both of which did not align with his aims. He also felt that certain expressions used in the movement were difficult to convey in English.

At the time, he deliberately adopted an emotionally detached approach in order to maintain objectivity and avoid being overwhelmed by emotion during the writing process. His work primarily draws on publicly available news reports and documents, with the goal of serving as a reference for future students. To help readers unfamiliar with Hong Kong politics, he devoted substantial space to explaining the background, thereby preventing future attempts in rewriting history. He found identity issues and police violence particularly challenging to handle—the former being inherently difficult to articulate, and the latter due to the sheer number of incidents.

The book's title, "A Community of Resistance," is drawn from the protest slogan "Hongkongers, resist." (Note: Chinese 「香港人，反抗」) However, its content focuses more on the movement itself than on the notion of community; Ma chose the title in part for its appeal to readers. Published by Taiwan's Rive Gauche Publishing House, the book also reflects a broader effort to circumvent tightening censorship in Hong Kong.

== Content ==
The book centers on the anti–Extradition Bill movement, covering its background, development, strategies, the Hong Kong government's responses, international reactions, the identity of Hong Kong residents and their interaction with the movement. In discussing the background, the author also traces the history of social movements in Hong Kong and changes in related consciousness.

In describing the movement, he examines the convergence of militant protesters and peaceful, rational, non-violent participants, analyzing its strengths and weaknesses, as well as the authorities' strategies of "divide-and-co-opt" versus "conflict escalation." The book argues that the movement disrupted Hong Kong's condition of "liberal autocracy," a term the author uses to describe a system in which those in power grant certain freedoms while not allowing challenges to their authority. It also suggests that the movement fostered a new sense of collective identity among participants.

== Reception ==
Fung Wai-kong, an editor at Apple Daily, considered A Community of Resistance to be a reliable record of the movement and noted its degree of objectivity, praising the author's clear writing. He also remarked that the emotional impact of the book slowed his reading, as he needed more time to process it. The book received the "Annual Chinese Creative Work" award at the 2020 Openbook Awards. One of the judges, Cheng Li-hsuan, an associate professor in the Department of Sociology at National Chengchi University in Taiwan, praised the work as "comprehensive," highlighting its incisive and detailed treatment of the movement, as well as the author's emotional perspective as a Hong Kong local.
