= International student =

Foreigner temporarily relocated for tertiary study

International students or exchange students, also known as foreign students, are students who undertake all or part of their secondary or tertiary education in a country other than their own.

In 2023, there were over 7.3 million international students, an increase of six percent from the prior year. The most popular destinations were in the Anglosphere. Four countries in particular received 43.82 percent of international students: the United States (with 1,177,766 international students), Canada (789,790 students), United Kingdom (732,285 students) and Australia (499,371 students).

== National definitions ==
Definitions of "foreign student" and "international student" vary from country to country. In the US, international students are "[i]ndividuals studying in the United States on a non-immigrant, temporary visa that allows for academic study at the post-secondary level." Most international students in the US hold an F1 Visa. In Europe, students from countries who are a part of the European Union can take part in a student exchange program called the Erasmus Programme. The program allows for students from the EU to study in other countries under a government agreement.

Canada defines international students as "non-Canadian students who do not have 'permanent resident' status and have had to obtain the authorization of the Canadian government to enter Canada with the intention of pursuing an education." The study permit identifies the level of study and the length of time the individual may study in Canada. Unless it takes more than six months, international students do not need a study permit if they will finish the course within the period of stay authorized upon entry. Canada's first International House (I-House), planned to help international students find housing and community, opened in 1959 at the University of British Columbia. In Australia, an international student "is not an Australian citizen, Australian permanent resident, New Zealand citizen, or a holder of an Australian permanent resident humanitarian visa."

According to the Institute of International Education, an international student in Japan is "[a] student from a foreign economy who is receiving an education at any Japanese university, graduate school, junior college, college of technology, professional training college or university preparatory course and who resides in Japan with a 'college student' visa status."

== Destinations of foreign students ==
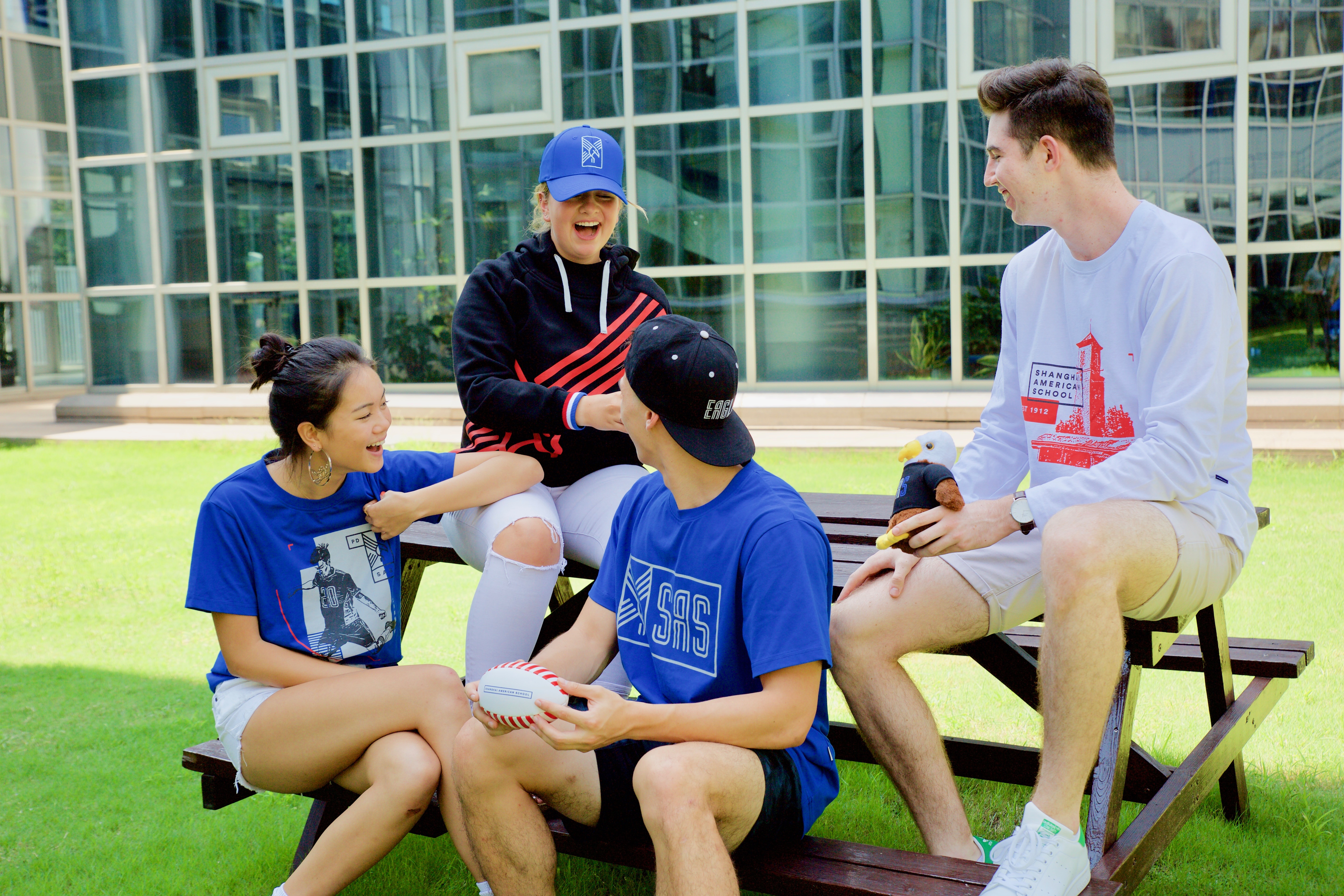
Students of different nationalities at an international school in Shanghai, China, 2017. The school does not have a school uniform.

Student mobility in the first decade of the 21st century has been transformed by three major external events: the September 11 attacks, the 2008 financial crisis, and an increasingly isolationist political order characterized by Brexit in the U.K. and the first presidency of Donald Trump in the U.S. Changes to the visa and immigration policies of destination countries impact the availability of employment during and after education. Political developments are often a major consideration; for example, a survey conducted before the 2020 presidential election in the U.S. indicated that a quarter of prospective international students were more likely to study in the country if Joseph R. Biden was elected president.

Traditionally, the US and UK have been the most prestigious choices. There is increasing competition from several destinations in East Asia such as China, South Korea, Japan, Taiwan, and Singapore, and other destinations such as Canada, Australia, New Zealand, the UAE, Germany, Norway, Argentina, and Brazil, which are keen to attract foreign students for reputation and demographic reasons.

According to OECD, almost one out of five foreign students is regionally mobile. This segment of regionally mobile students who seek global education at local cost is defined as "glocal" students]. Many "glocal" students consider pursuing transnational or cross-border education which allows them to earn a foreign credential while staying in their home countries. With the increase in tuition cost in leading destinations like the US and the UK along with the higher immigration barriers, many international students are exploring alternative destinations and demanding more "value for money." Recalibrating value for money for international students. It is projected that the number of internationally mobile students will reach 6.9 million by 2030, an increase of 51%, or 2.3 million students, from 2015. The affordability of international education is an area of concern not only for international students but also universities and nations interested in attracting them.

As of 2025, the top 10 countries for foreign student enrollment according to Institute of International Education:

Rank	Destination country	Numbers of foreign students			Top sending countries
Rank	Destination country	2025	2024	% change	Top sending countries
1	United States	1,177,766	1,126,690	+4.53%	India, China, South Korea
2	Canada	789,790	842,760	−6.29%	India, China, Philippines
3	United Kingdom	732,285	758,855	−3.50%	India, China, Nigeria
4	Australia	499,371	437,485	+14.15%	China, India, Nepal
5	France	430,466	412,100	+4.46%	Morocco, Algeria, China
6	Germany	379,939	367,578	+3.36%	India, China, Turkey
7	Russia	336,453	321,845	+4.54%	Kazakhstan,Turkmenistan, China
8	South Korea	253,434	208,962	+21.28%	China, Vietnam, Uzbekistan
9	Japan	229,467	188,555	+21.70%	China, Vietnam, Nepal
10	China	194,327	200,892	−3.27%	South Korea, Thailand, Japan

As of 2024, the top 10 countries for foreign student enrollment according to UNESCO:

Rank	Destination country	Numbers of foreign students		
Rank	Destination country	2024	2023	% change
1	United States		956,923	—N/a
2	United Kingdom		748,461	—N/a
3	Australia	580,287	467,074	+24.24%
4	Germany	438,260	423,197	+3.56%
5	Canada		389,181	—N/a
6	Russia		336,453	—N/a
7	France	284,865	276,217	+3.13%
8	United Arab Emirates	238,986	237,034	+0.82%
9	China	194,327	200,892	−3.27%
10	Japan		181,821	—N/a

=== Asia ===
==== China ====
In 2016, China was the third largest receiver of international students globally, with 442,773 international students. By 2018 this number had grown to 492,185 (10.49% growth from 2017).

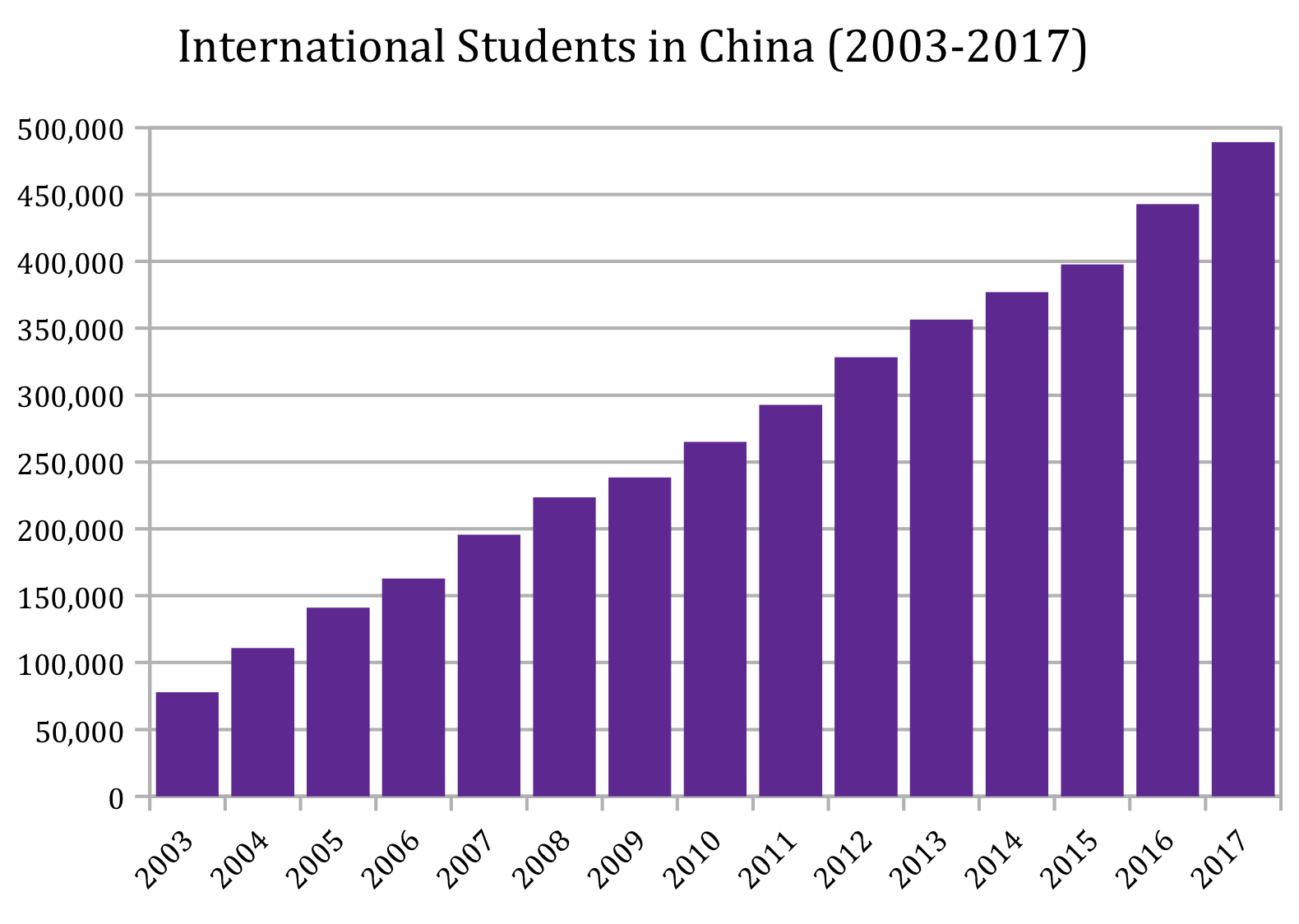
International Students in China (2003-2017)

The number of international students in China has grown steadily since 2003, with apparently no impact from the rise of terrorism or the Great Recession. China is now the leading destination globally for Anglophone African students.

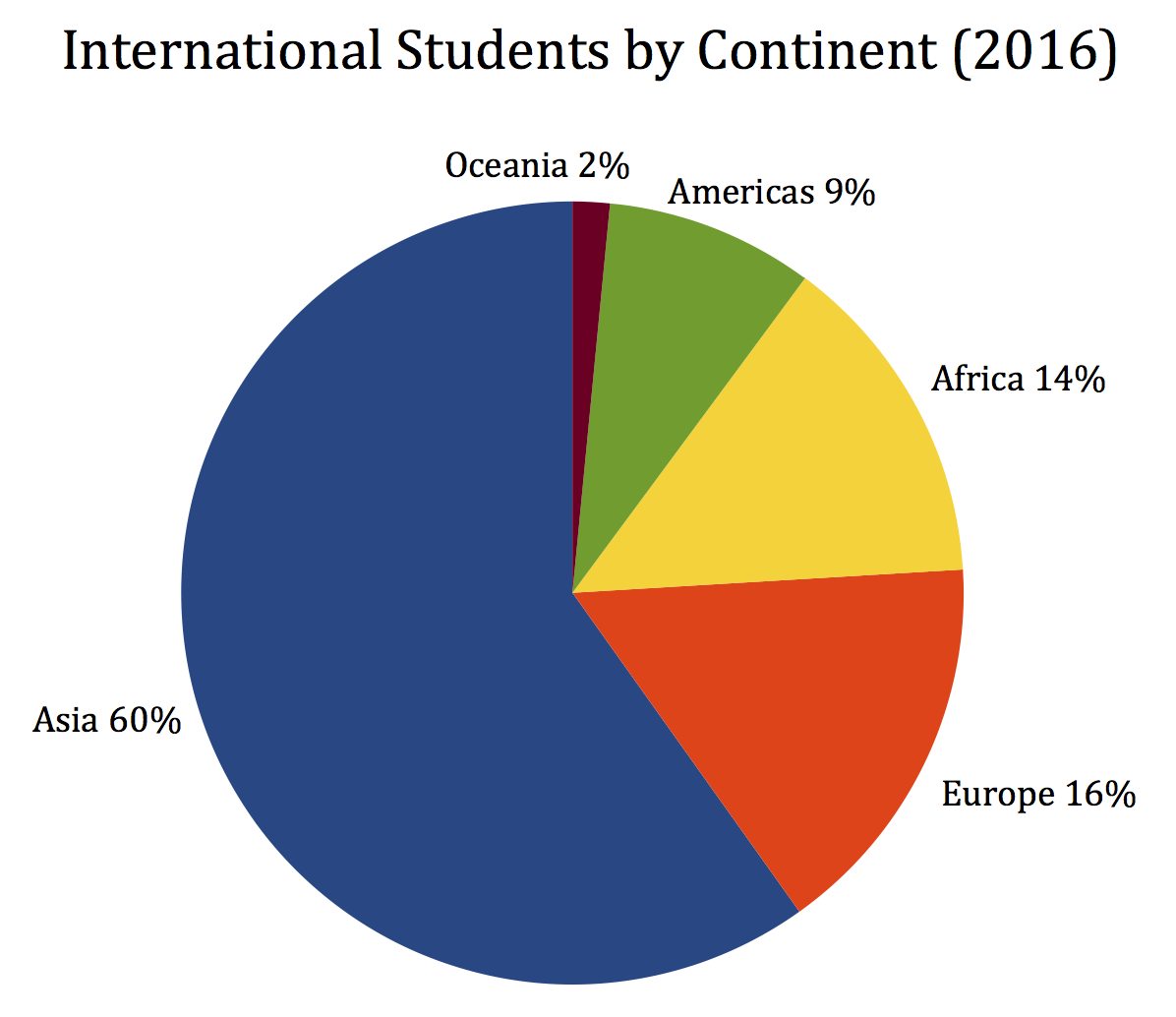
Number of international students in China (2016) by sending continent.

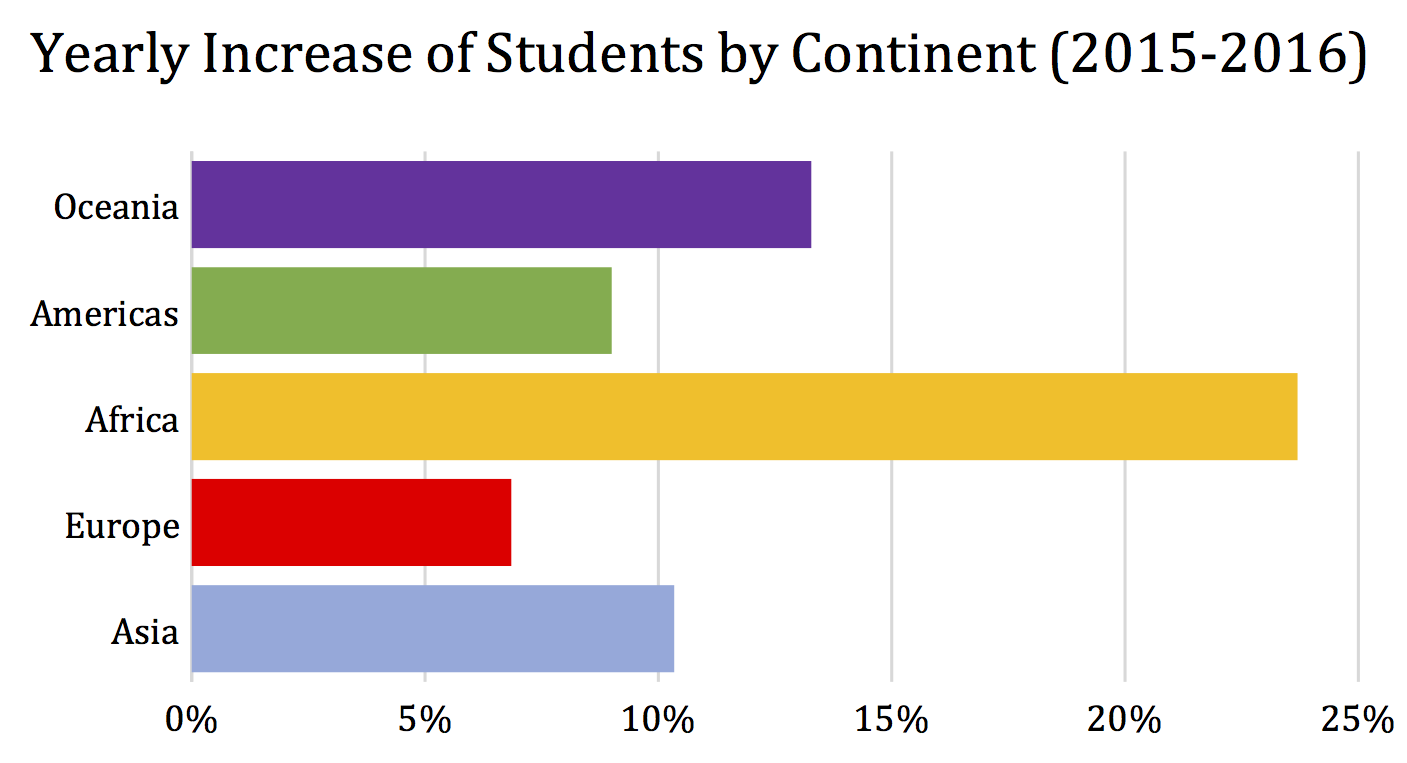
Yearly increase of international students coming to China by continent (2015-2016).

In 2016, the students coming to China were mostly from Asia (60%), followed by Europe (16%) and Africa (14%). However, Africa had the highest growth rate at 23.7 percent year-on-year 2015–2016.

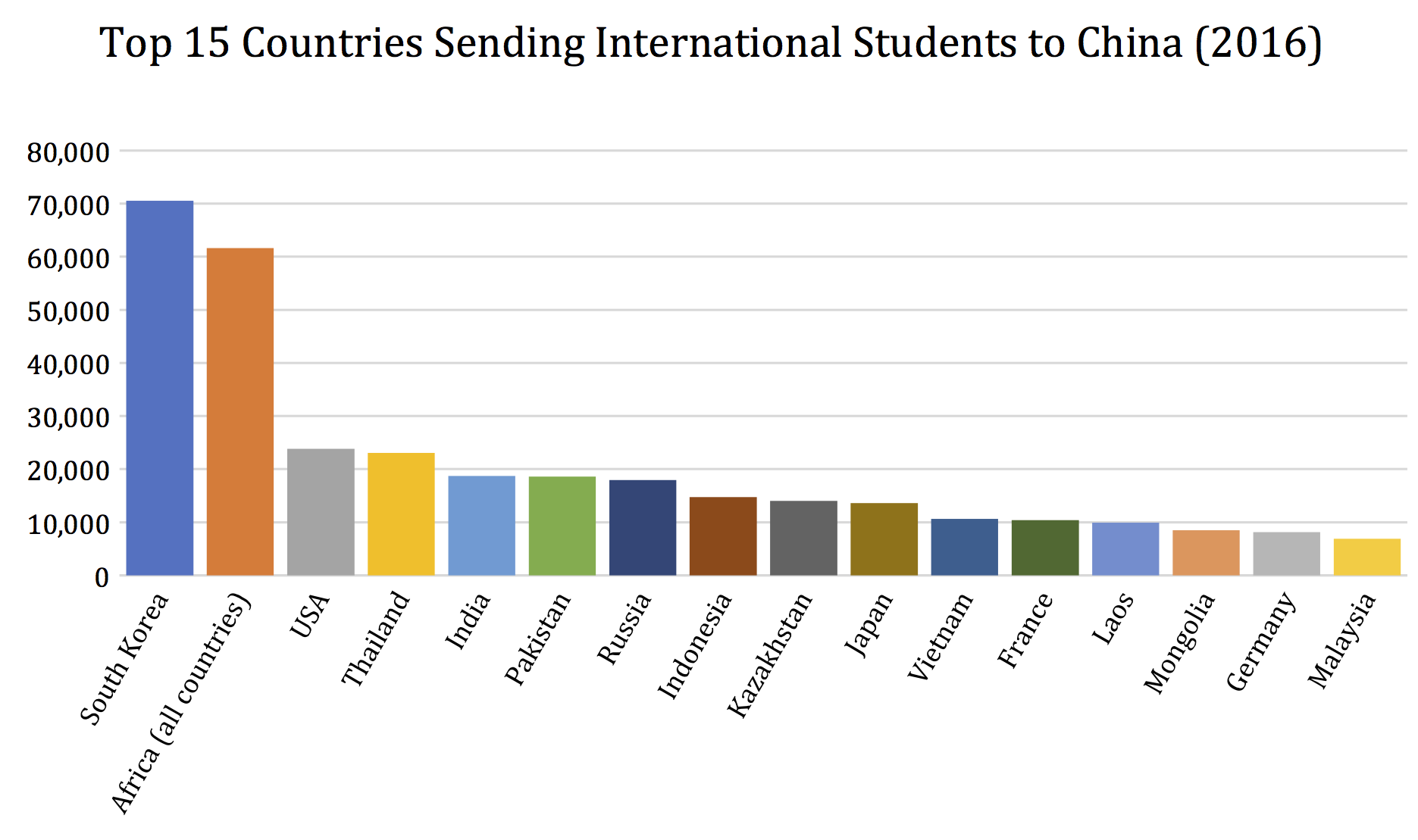
Top 15 Countries Sending International Students to China (2016)

The top 15 countries sending students to China in 2018 are listed below. African countries are grouped and show a considerable block of students.

Rank (2018)	Country	Number of foreign students			Rank (2017)
Rank (2018)	Country	2018	2017	% of Total (2018)	Rank (2017)
-	All African countries grouped together	81,562	61,594	16.57%	-
1	South Korea **	50,600	70,540	10.28%	1
2	Thailand **	28,608	23,044	5.81%	2
3	Pakistan **	28,023	18,626	5.69%	3
4	India **	23,192	18,717	4.71%	5
5	United States **	20,996	23,838	4.27%	4
6	Russia **	19,239	17,971	3.91%	6
7	Indonesia **	15,050	14,714	3.06%	8
8	Laos **	14,645	-	2.98%	-
9	Japan **	14,230	13,595	2.89%	7
10	Kazakhstan **	11,784	13,996	2.39%	9
11	Vietnam **	11,299	10,639	2.30%	
12	Bangladesh **	10,735	-	2.18%	-
13	France **	10,695	-	2.17%	-
14	Mongolia **	10,158	-	2.06%	-
15	Malaysia **	9,479	-	1.93%	-

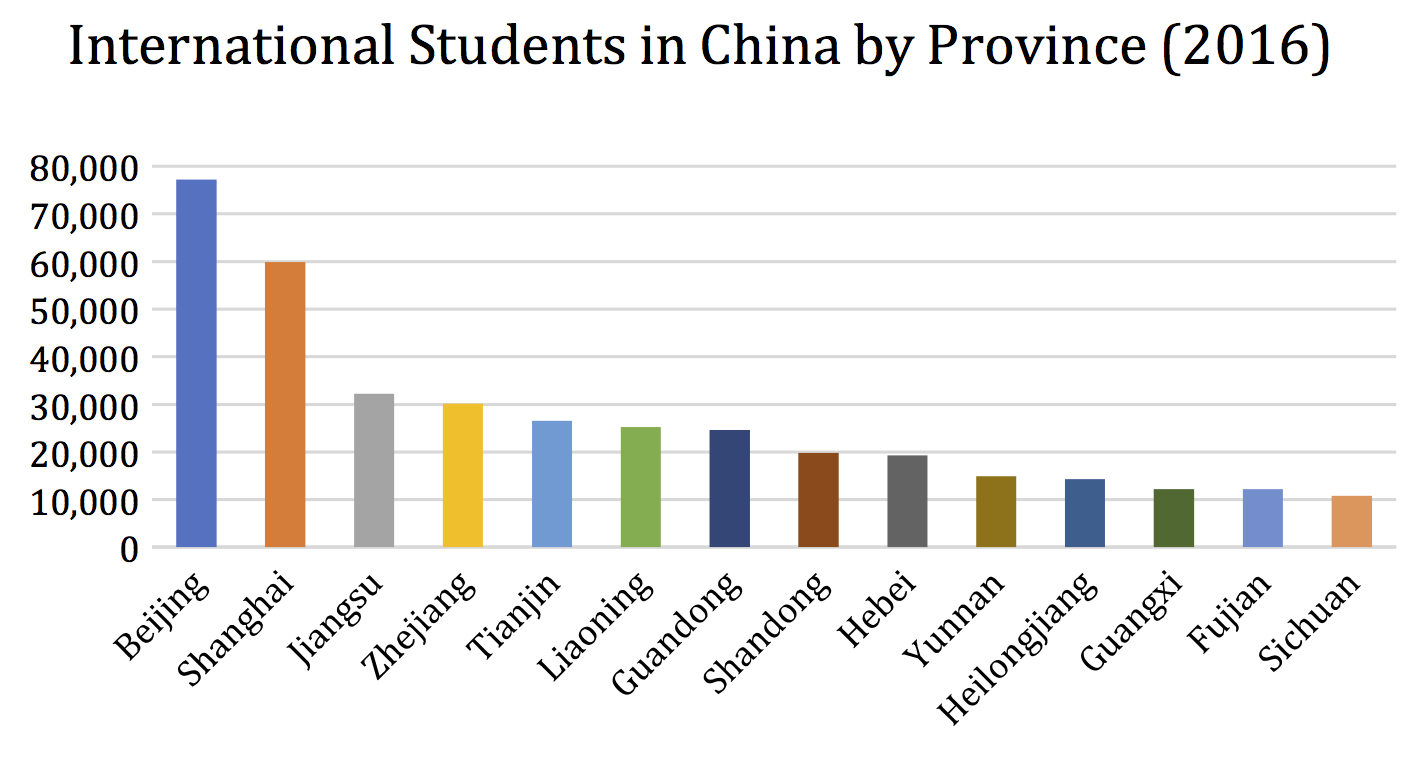
International Students in China by province (2016)

In 2016, international students mostly went to study in the major centers of Beijing (77,234, 17.44%) and Shanghai (59,887, 13.53%). In recent years, there has been a decentralization and dispersion of students to other provinces.

China is openly pursuing a policy of growing its soft power globally, by way of persuasion and attraction. Attracting international students, especially by way of scholarships, is one effective way of growing this influence.

==== India ====
In 2019, India was hosting over 47,000 overseas students, and aims to quadruple the number to 200,000 students by 2023. India has most of its international students and targets from South, Southeast, West Asia and Africa and is running various fee waiver and scholarship programs.

2019-20 academic year
Rank	Country	Number of Students	% of Total
1	Nepal	13,880	28.1%
2	Afghanistan	4,504	9.1%
3	Bangladesh	2,259	4.6%
4	Bhutan	1,851	3.8%
5	Sudan	1,758	3.6%
6	United States	1,627	3.3%
7	Nigeria	1,525	3.1%
8	Yemen	1,437	2.9%
9	Malaysia	1,353	2.7%
10	United Arab Emirates	1,347	2.7%
Share of top 10 countries		31,533	63.9%
Others		17,815	36.1%
Total		49,348	100%

==== Iran ====
Iran had 55000 studying in 2018 . In 2021 it doubled to more than 130000 with half of them enrolled in Azad University and Payamnoor. Iran Signed up PMF Iraqi Popular Mobilization Forces to study at University of Tehran. By 2023 there were students from 15 countries such as Lebanon, Iraq, Russia, Syria, Pakistan and African countries. They study humanities, sciences, law, medicine, construction, and accounting.

==== Japan ====
Japan is perceived as an evolving destination for international students. Japan has around 180,000 overseas students studying at its institutions, and the government has set targets to increase this to 300,000 over the next few years. According to the Japan Student Services Organization (JASSO), the number of international students on 1 May 2024 was 336,708 people.

==== Malaysia and Singapore ====
Malaysia, Singapore and India are emerging destinations for international students. These three countries have a combined share of approximately 12 percent of the global student market, with somewhere between 250,000 and 300,000 students having decided to pursue higher education studies in these countries in 2005–2006.

==== South Korea ====
In April 2024, the number of international students studying at universities and colleges in South Korea was 208,962. As of 2024, the most common nationalities of international students were countries from Asia, Europe, North America, Africa, and South America. Among the students, 69.8 percent were degree students, and 30.2 percent were non-degree students such as exchange students or language students. The number of students attending universities in the Seoul Metropolitan Area was 56 percent of the total.

=== Australia and Oceania ===
Australia has the highest ratio of international students per head of population in the world, with 775,475 international students enrolled in the nation's universities and vocational institutions in 2020. In 2019, international students represented 27 percent of the student bodies of Australian universities. International education is one of the country's largest exports and has a pronounced influence on the country's demographics, as many students remain in Australia after graduation.

=== Europe ===
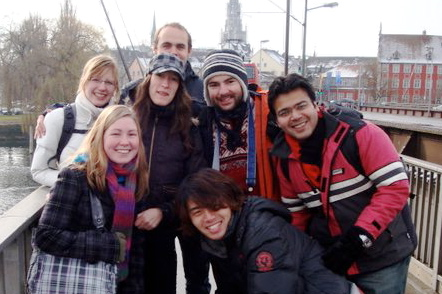
International students in Liechtenstein

==== France and Germany ====
In 2023-24, France received 412,087 international students. Germany received 469,485 international students in 2023-24. Since the 2016/17 academic year, the number of foreign students attending university in Germany has constantly risen, climbing from 358,895 students five years ago to 411,601 students last year.

With the Franco-German University, the two countries have established a framework for cooperation between their universities, enabling students to participate in specific Franco-German courses of study across borders.

The top 10 countries sending students to France in 2022-23 are listed below.

Rank	Country	Number of students	% of total
1	Morocco	45,162	11.2%
2	Algeria	32,147	8.0–
3	China	25,605	6.3%
4	Italy	20,028	5.0%
5	Senegal	15,251	3.8%
6	Tunisia	14,291	3.5%
7	Spain	11,594	2.9%
8	Lebanon	11,527	2.9%
9	Ivory Coast	10,691	2.7%
10	Cameroon	9,767	2.4%

The top 10 countries sending students to Germany in 2023-24 are listed below.

Rank	Country	Number of students	% of total
1	India	49,008	10.4%
2	China	38,687	8.2%
3	Turkey	18,084	3.9%
4	Austria	15,379	3.3%
5	Iran	15,159	3.2%
6	Syria	13,379	2.8%
7	Russia	10,593	2.3%
8	France	10,154	2.2%
9	Ukraine	9,914	2.1%
10	Pakistan	9,873	2.1%

==== Ireland ====
In Ireland, the Higher Education Authority reported 44,535 non-Irish domiciled enrolments in publicly funded higher education institutions in 202425, an increase of 10.2 percent on the previous year. Non-EU enrolments accounted for 32,940 of these enrolments, and the most common non-Irish domiciles were India, the United States and China.

Quality and Qualifications Ireland operates TrustEd Ireland, a statutory quality mark for higher education and English-language education providers that meet national standards for provision to international learners. Providers wishing to recruit non-EU/EEA learners on programmes requiring immigration permission or study visas are required to apply for authorisation to use the mark.

==== United Kingdom ====
The top 15 countries and regions sending students to the United Kingdom in 2023–24 are listed below.

Rank	Place of origin	Number of students	Percent of total
1	India	166,310	22.7%
2	China	149,855	20.5%
3	Nigeria	57,505	7.9%
4	Pakistan	45,720	6.2%
5	United States	23,250	3.2%
6	Hong Kong	17,250	2.4%
7	Malaysia	12,760	1.7%
8	Nepal	12,715	1.7%
9	Bangladesh	12,285	1.7%
10	Ireland	9,690	1.3%
11	Saudi Arabia	9,680	1.3%
12	France	8,680	1.2%
13	United Arab Emirates	8,535	1.2%
14	Canada	7,840	1.1%
15	Italy	7,160	1.0%
Others		183,020	25.0%
Total		732,285	100%

==== Italy ====
The top 15 countries and regions sending students to Italy in 2023–24 are listed below.

Rank	Place of origin	Number of students	Percent of total
1	Romania	14,000	
2	Iran	13,000	
3	Turkey	6,000	
4	China	6,000	
5	India	4,000	
6	Russia	3,000	
7	Albania	2,000	
8	Tunisia	2,000	
9	Pakistan	2,000	
10	Morocco	2,000	
11	Kazakhstan	2,000	
12	Cameroon	2,000	
13	France	2,000	
14	Egypt	1,000	
15	Brazil	1,000	
15	Israel	1,000	
Others		183,020	
Total		732,285	

==== Netherlands ====
As of 2017, 81,000 international students studied in the Netherlands, comprising 12% of the higher education student population. Of these students, 12,500 students, or 15.4,% were Dutch nationals who had studied elsewhere previously. Three-fourths of international students in the Netherlands come from European Union countries, with the largest segment of that population coming from Germany. Of the non-EU students, the largest portion is composed of Chinese students. Two-thirds of all international students come to the Netherlands for their bachelor's degree.

==== Russia ====
Russia, since Soviet times, has been a hub for international students, mainly from the developing world. It is the world's fifth-leading destination for international students, hosting roughly 300 thousand in 2019.

The top 10 countries sending students to Russia in 2019 are listed below.

Rank	Country	Number of students
1	Kazakhstan	71,368
2	Turkmenistan	27,889
3	Uzbekistan	27,397
4	Tajikistan	21,397
5	Ukraine	21,609
6	China	18,531
7	India	12,501
8	Belarus	11,614
9	Azerbaijan	10,946
10	Kyrgyzstan	7,291

=== North America ===
==== Canada ====
Immigration, Refugees and Citizenship Canada (IRCC) reckons that as of December 2023, there were 1,040,985 international students, which is a 29% increase from the previous year. In 2023, 26.8 percent of the international students in Canada were from India and 5.6 percent were from China. The newest Canadian government International Education Strategy (IES) for the period 2019-2024 includes a commitment to diversify inbound students and distribute them more equally across the country rather than having a strong concentration in a few cities.

The top 15 countries and regions sending students to Canada in 2023 are listed below.

Rank	Country or territory	Number of students	Percent of total
1	India	278,860	26.8%
2	China	58,430	5.6%
3	Nigeria	37,675	3.6%
4	Philippines	33,945	3.3%
5	Nepal	15,985	1.5%
6	France	15,540	1.5%
7	Iran	14,780	1.4%
8	Mexico	11,435	1.1%
9	Vietnam	10,805	1.0%
10	Colombia	10,530	1.0%
11	South Korea	10,510	1.0%
12	Brazil	10,410	1.0%
13	Bangladesh	9,535	0.9%
14	Algeria	9,385	0.9%
15	Hong Kong	7,900	0.8%
Others		535,725	51.5%
Total		1,040,985	100%

==== United States ====
1,126,690 foreign students enrolled in American colleges in 2023–24. The largest number, 331,602, came from India.

US colleges and universities have welcomed students from China. 10 million students throughout China take the national college entrance test, competing for 5.7 million university places. Because foreign undergraduates typically fail to qualify for US federal aid, colleges can provide only limited financial help. Now, thanks to China's booming economy in recent years, more Chinese families can afford to pay.

Chinese international students face other challenges besides language proficiency. The Chinese educational structure focuses on exam-oriented education, with educational thinking and activities aimed towards meeting the entrance examination. Students become more focused on exam performance, and teachers are inclined to focus on lecturing to teach students what may be on the test. In addition, "parents are also convinced that the more students listened to the lectures, the better they would score on the finals." With more than 304,040 Chinese students enrolled in the US in 2014/15, China is by far the leading source of international students at American universities and colleges; however, there are three waves of growth in Chinese students in the US.

Each of the three waves differs in terms of needs and expectations and the corresponding support services needed.

== Requirements ==
Prospective foreign students are usually required to sit for language tests before they are admitted. Tests notwithstanding, while some international students already possess an excellent command of the local language upon arrival, some find their language ability, considered excellent domestically, inadequate for the purpose of understanding lectures, and/or of conveying oneself fluently in rapid conversations. A research report commissioned by NAFSA: Association of International Educators investigated the scope of third-party providers offerings intensive English preparation programs with academic credit for international students in the United States. These pathway programs are designed to recruit and support international students needing additional help with English and academic preparation before matriculating to a degree program.

=== Student visa ===
Generally, foreign students, as citizens of other countries,s are required to obtain a student visa, which ascertains their legal status for staying in the second country. In the United States, before students come to the country, the students must select a school to attend to qualify for a student visa. The course of study and the type of school a foreign student plans to attend determine whether an F-1 visa or an M-1 visa is needed. Each student visa applicant must prove they have the financial ability to pay for their tuition, books, and living expenses while they study in the United States.

== Higher education marketing ==
Marketing of higher education is a well-entrenched macro process today, especially in the major English-speaking nations: Australia, Canada, New Zealand, the UK, and the USA. One of the major factors behind the worldwide evolution of educational marketing could be globalization, which has dramatically shrunken the world. Due to intensifying competition for overseas students amongst MESDCs, i.e., major English-speaking destination countries, higher educational institutions recognize the significance of marketing themselves in the international arena. To build sustainable international student recruitment strategies Higher Education Institutions (HEIs) need to diversify the markets from which they recruit, both to take advantage of future growth potential from emerging markets, and to reduce dependency on – and exposure to risk from – major markets such as China, India and Nigeria, where demand has proven to be volatile. For recruitment strategies, there are some approaches that higher education institutions adopt to ensure stable enrollments of international students, such as developing university preparation programs, like the Global Assessment Certificate (GAC) Program, and launching international branch campuses in foreign countries.

=== Global Assessment Certificate (GAC) Program ===
The Global Assessment Certificate (GAC) Program is a university preparation program, developed and provided by ACT Education Solution, Ltd., for the purpose of helping students to prepare for admission and enrollment overseas. The program helps students from non-English speaking backgrounds to prepare for university-level study, so they can successfully finish a bachelor's degree at university. Students who complete the GAC program have the opportunity to be admitted to 120 so called Pathway Universities, located in destinations including the United States, the United Kingdom, and Canada. Mainly, the program consists of curricula, such as Academic English, Mathematics, Computing, Study Skills, Business, Science, and Social Science. Moreover, the program also provides the opportunity to get prepared for the ACT exam and English Proficiency tests like TOEFL and IELTS.

=== Foreign branch campuses ===
Opening international branch campuseses is a new strategy for recruiting foreign students in other countries to build strong global outreach by overcoming the limitations of physical distance. Indeed, opening branch campuses plays a significant role in widening the landscape of higher education. In the past, along with high demand for higher education, many universities in the United States established their branch campuses in foreign countries. According to a report by the Observatory on Borderless Higher Education (OBHE), there was a 43% increase in the number of foreign branch campuses in the worldwide scale since 2006. American higher education institutions mostly take a dominant position in growth rate and the number of foreign branch campuses, accounting for almost 50% of current foreign branch campuses. However, some research reports have recently said foreign branch campuses are facing several challenges and setbacks, for example interference of local government, sustainability problems, and long-term prospects like damage to academic reputations and finance.

== Challenges ==
=== Language ===
Most foreign students encounter difficulties in language use. Such issues make it difficult to gain familiarity with the local culture. Sometimes, these language barriers can subject international students to ignorance or disrespect from native speakers. Most international students also lack support groups in the country where they are studying. All colleges in North America that are in student exchange programs do have an International Student Office. The more students a particular college has who come from the same country, the better the support is for getting involved in the new culture. Similarly, an Australian study reported language and acculturation challenges for international students who participate in higher education programs.

Foreign students face several challenges in their academic studies at North American universities. Studies have shown that these challenges include several different factors: inadequate English proficiency; unfamiliarity with North American culture; lack of appropriate study skills or strategies; academic learning anxiety; low social self-efficacy; financial difficulties; and separation from family and friends. Despite the general perception that American culture is diverse rather than homogenous, the American ideology of cultural homogeneity has been alleged to imply an American mindset that because Eurocentric cultures are superior to others, people with different cultures should conform to the dominant monocultural canon and norms.

=== Economic impact ===
Research from the National Association of Foreign Student Advisers (NAFSA) shows the economic benefits of the increasing international higher-education enrollment in the United States. According to their 2021–2022 academic year analysis, nearly one million international students contributed $33.8 billion to the US economy and 335,000 jobs. This represents almost a 19% increase in dollars compared to the previous year. International students contribute more than job and monetary gains to the economy. "The increase in economic activity is certainly positive news, but it should be kept in perspective: it shows we've only regained about half the ground lost in the previous academic year," said Dr. Esther D. Brimmer, NAFSA executive director and CEO. "We must not be complacent that this upward trend will automatically continue. According to NAFSA's research, their diverse views contribute to technological innovation, which has increased America's ability to compete in the global economy.

International students crowding out domestic students has been observed, particularly at selective programs.

Some international students have faced suspicions of involvement in economic and industrial espionage.

=== Barriers ===
International students also face cross-cultural barriers that hinder their ability to succeed in a new environment. For example, there are differences in terms of receiving and giving feedback, which influences academic engagement and even the job and internship search approach of international students.

Transparency is an issue that international students face when coming across activities within class, specifically when it comes to group discussions; it may be a bigger obstacle. Firstly, the issue of how topics being discussed may not need further elaboration when it comes to local students and for an international student, the ability of the student to be able to understand and contribute may diminish in return. This may be due to the feeling of dismissal via the appearance of lack of interest in their opinion. Another would be the failure of expected scaffolding during group discussions when it comes to international students. This is due to the need for a developed understanding of local culture, or "cultural facts" as represented by Kim. This represents the knowledge of humor, vernacular, or simple connotations in speech that may allow international students to further develop an understanding of a given topic.

=== Plagiarism and fraud ===
Worries about academic dishonesty on test scores and transcripts make occasional headlines. And even Chinese students who score highly on an English-language proficiency test may not be able to speak or write well enough to stay up to speed in a US classroom, where essay writing and discussions are common.

Plagiarism is the most serious offense in academia. Plagiarism has two subtle forms, one of which includes the omission of elements required for proper citations and references. The second form is unacknowledged use or incorporation of another person's work or achievement. Violation of either form can result in a student's expulsion. International students from some cultures lack the concept of plagiarism. Most of them are unfamiliar with American academic standards and colleges are not good about giving a clear definition of the word's meaning. For example, many international students don't know that using even one sentence of someone else's work can be considered plagiarism. Most colleges give students an E on their plagiarized assignments, and future offenses often result in failing class or being kicked out of university.

=== Mental wellness ===
International students studying in a foreign country face a life-altering event that can cause distress and potentially affect their mental wellness. Many students report homesickness and loneliness in their initial transition, experience isolation from peers, and struggle with understanding cultural differences while staying abroad. In certain cultures, mental illness is seen as a sign of weakness. Because of this, international students believe they can prevail through their struggles alone without help, which can lead to a decrease in mental wellness.

There are two common symptoms among international students from China in particular: 45% of the students faced depression and 29% of the students faced anxiety. Stressors that lead international students to struggle with anxiety are rooted in numerous causes, including academic pressures, financial issues, adapting to a new culture, creating friendships, and feelings of loneliness. International students are also more likely to rely on peers for support through their transition than teachers or adult peers. If the student is unable to make friends in their new environment, they will struggle more with their transition than an international student who has established relationships with their peers. During the COVID-19 pandemic, many international students started remote learning and had to overcome time differences to take classes online, which further led to sleep disruption, social isolation, and thus, higher rates of mental health symptoms.

Language and communication barriers have been noted to add to student anxiety and stress. International students face language discrimination, which may exacerbate mental health symptoms. Evidence has not conclusively shown that language discrimination is a greater risk factor than discrimination against foreigners. However, there has not been any conclusive evidence to show whether language discrimination plays a significantly larger role than simple foreigner discrimination.

International students are less likely to use individual counseling provided by the university. and may experience even more intense stigmas against seeking professional help, group-oriented ways of reaching students may be more helpful. Group activities, like collaborative workshops and cultural exchange groups, can introduce a sense of community among the students. In addition, efforts can be placed to improve awareness and accessibility to mental wellness resources and counseling services. Social workers, faculty, and academic staff can be educated beforehand to provide an adequate support for them.

=== Housing ===
Accommodation is a major factor that determines study abroad experience. Increases of students has been associated with less affordable housing in some areas.

== Study abroad ==
Studying abroad is the act of a student pursuing educational opportunities in a country other than one's own. This can include primary, secondary and post-secondary students. A 2012 study showed number of students studying abroad represents about 9.4% of all students enrolled at institutions of higher education in the United States and it is a part of experience economy.

Studying abroad is a valuable program for international students as it is intended to increase the students' knowledge and understanding of other cultures. International education not only helps students with their language and communication skills. It also encourages students to develop a different perspective and cross-cultural understanding of their studies, which will further their education and benefit them in their career. The main factors that determine the outcome quality of international studies are transaction dynamics (between the environmental conditions and the international student), quality of environment, and the student's coping behavior.

=== Coping with studying abroad ===
Affectivity is an emotional disposition: people who are high on positive affectivity experience positive emotions and moods like joy and excitement, and view the world, including themselves and other people, in a positive light. They tend to be cheerful, enthusiastic, lively, sociable, and energetic. Research has found that students studying abroad with a positive emotional tendency have higher satisfaction and interaction with the environment; they engage in the host country's citizenship behaviours.

Being relevant to research on coping by international students, the concept of adjustment to a foreign work environment and its operationalisation has been the subject of broad methodological discussion.

== See also ==
- Apprentices mobility
- EducationUSA
- Erasmus programme
- F-1 Visa
- Fulbright Program
- Goodwill Scholarships
- International Baccalaureate
- International communication
- International education
- International Student Identity Card
- International student ministry
- International Students Day
- International students in South Korea
- Japanese students in Britain
- Monbukagakusho Scholarship
- Pakistani students abroad
- Student exchange program
- Student migration
- Indian students abroad
- Vulcanus in Japan

=== Organizations ===
- Brethren Colleges Abroad
- International Union of Students
- Interamerican University Studies Institute
- NAFSA: Association of International Educators
- Journal of International Students
