= AAEC =

AAEC may refer to:

- Association of American Editorial Cartoonists, active in the US, Canada and Mexico
- Australian Atomic Energy Commission, a statutory body of the Australian government
- Fulbright Austria, the Austrian-American Educational Commission, a bilateral educational commission and Fulbright program
- "Appreciable Adverse Effect on Competition", anti-competitive agreements in The Competition Act, 2002 of India
