= Ma Ngok =

Ngok Ma
- 馬嶽
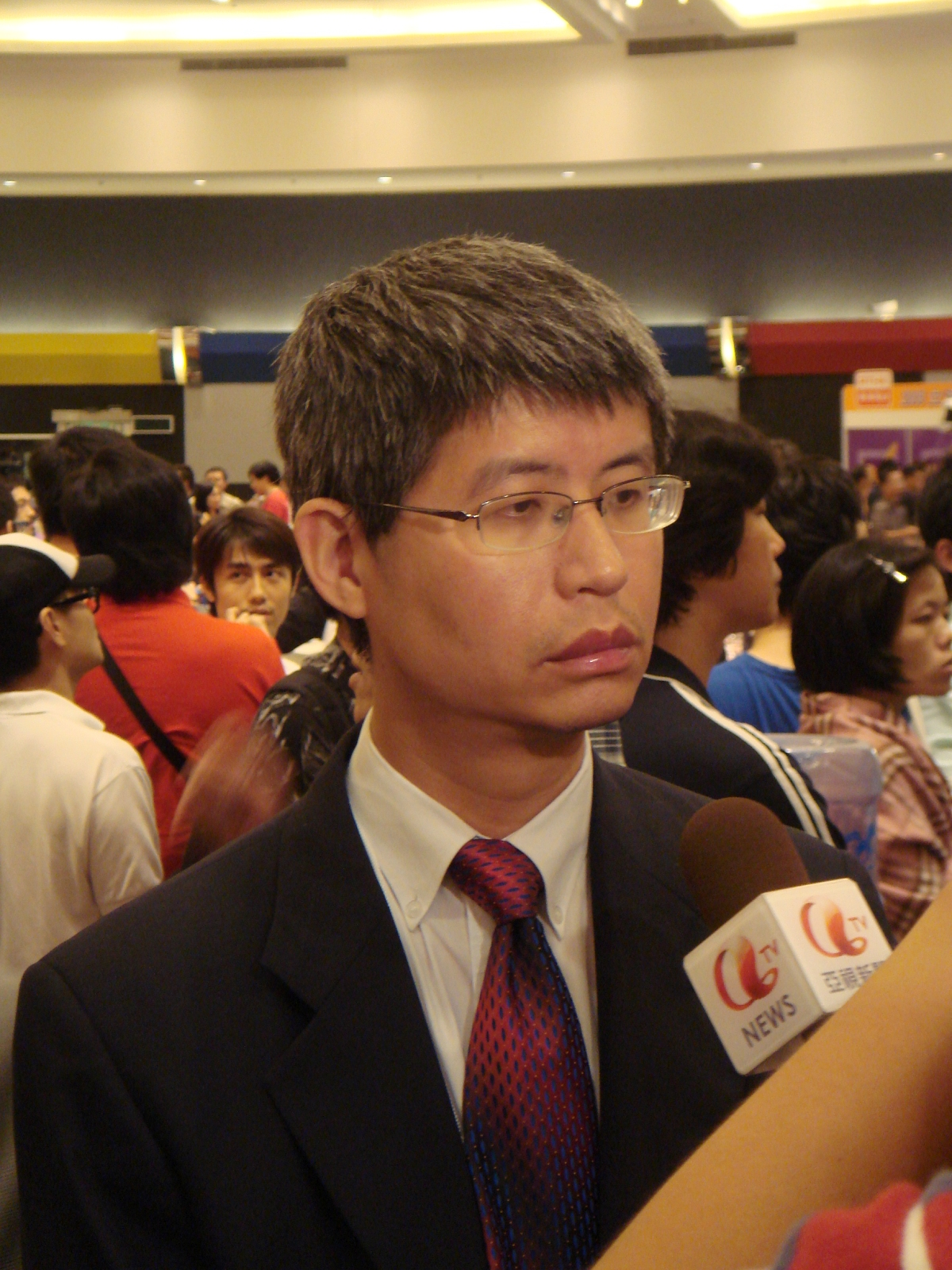
- Ma in 2008
- Born: Hong Kong

Education
- Education: Wah Yan College, Kowloon; CUHK; UCLA

Philosophical work
- Institutions: CUHK; HKUST; CityU
- Main interests: Hong Kong politics Democratization

Ma Ngok (Chinese: 馬嶽) is a Hong Kong political scientist and pundit. He was an associate professor at School of Governance and Policy Science of the Chinese University of Hong Kong, and retired in July 2026.

On 16 December 2021, he and Ivan Choy publicly stated that, with the old electoral system becoming history, the new system has undergone significant changes in its composition, its reflection of public opinion, and its operational logic. As a result, the analytical frameworks used in the past are no longer applicable, and they expect to gradually withdraw from research on Hong Kong elections and from political commentary.

== Education ==
Ma was educated at the Wah Yan College, Kowloon and graduated from the Chinese University of Hong Kong (CUHK) with bachelor degrees in Journalism and later master in Politics. He obtained a doctoral degree from University of California, Los Angeles.

== Academic career ==
Ma taught at City University of Hong Kong and Hong Kong University of Science and Technology (HKUST). He is now associate professor at CUHK.

== Research ==
Ma specializes in Hong Kong politics and democratization. He argues that as ordinary Hong Kong people place economic prosperity over liberty and freedom, the long-term future of "One Country, Two Systems" is in jeopardy. He also criticizes the Government's move to exempt mainland offices and officials free from legal oversight.

== Works ==
=== Books ===
- 特區選舉：制度與投票行為 [The Electoral System and Voting Behaviour in the Hong Kong Special Administrative Region] (in Chinese). City University of Hong Kong Press. 2021. ISBN 978-986-98656-8-5.
- 反抗的共同體 [A Community of Resistance] (in Chinese). Rive Gauche Publishing House. 2020. ISBN 978-986-98656-8-5.
- 民主十問 [Ten Questions on Democracy] (in Chinese). City University of Hong Kong Press. 2016. ISBN 978-962-937-262-0.
- 香港80年代民主運動口述歷史 [An Oral History of Democratic Movement of Hong Kong in the 1980s] (in Chinese). City University of Hong Kong Press. 2012. ISBN 978-962-937-199-9.
- Political Development in Hong Kong: State, Political Society, and Civil Society. Hong Kong University Press. 2007. ISBN 978-962-209-810-7.
- 教授足球 : 以治學態度睇波 [Explaining Football: Watching the Game with an Academic Approach] (in Chinese). Tom (Cup Magazine) Publishing Ltd. 2005. ISBN 978-9889840976.
- 選舉制度的政治效果：港式比例代表制的經驗 [Political Consequences of Electoral Systems: The Hong Kong Proportional Representation System] (in Chinese). City University of Hong Kong Press. 2003. ISBN 962-937-087-5.

=== Articles ===
- "The Making of a Corporatist State in Hong Kong: The Road to Sectoral Intervention." Journal of Contemporary China 46.2 (2016): 247–66.
- "Migrants and Democratization: The Political Economy of Chinese Immigrants in Hong Kong." Contemporary Chinese Political Economy and Strategic Relations 2.2 (2016): 909–40. (with Stan Hok-Wui Wong and Wai-man Lam)
- "The Rise of "Anti-China" Sentiments in Hong Kong and the 2012 Legislative Council Elections." China Review 15.1 (2015): 39–66.
- "Value Changes and Legitimacy Crisis in Post-industrial Hong Kong." Asian Survey 51.4 (2011): 683–712.
- "Hong Kong’s Democrats Divide." Journal of Democracy 22.1 (2011): 54–67.
- "Twenty Years of Functional Elections in Hong Kong: Exclusive Corporatism or Alternative Democratic Form?." Representation 45.4 (2009): 421–33.
- "Reinventing the Hong Kong State or Rediscovering It? From Low Interventionism to Eclectic Corporatism." Economy and Society 38.3 (2009): 492–519.
- "Civil Society and Democratization in Hong Kong: Paradox and Duality." Taiwan Journal of Democracy 4.2 (2008): 155–75.
- "State-Press Relationship in Post-1997 Hong Kong: Constant Negotiation Amidst Self-Restraint." China Quarterly 192 (2007): 949–70.
- "Money, Power and Ideas: Think Tank Development and State–Business Relations in Taiwan and Hong Kong." Policy and Politics 34.3 (2006): 535–55. (with Ray Yep)
- "Civil Society in Self-Defense: The Struggle against National Security Legislation in Hong Kong." Journal of Contemporary China 14.44 (2005): 465–82.
- "Democracy at a Stalemate: The September 2004 Legco Elections in Hong Kong." China Perspectives 57 (2005): 40–9.
- "After 1997: The Dialectics of Hong Kong Dependence." Journal of Contemporary Asia 34.2 (2004): 254–70. (with Ian Holliday and Ray Yep)
- "SARS and the Limits of the Hong Kong SAR Administrative State." Asian Perspective 28.1 (2004): 99–120.
- "The Impact of Electoral Rule Change on Party Campaign Strategy: Hong Kong as a Case Study." Party Politics 9.3 (2003): 347–67. (with Chi-keung Choy)
- "A High Degree of Autonomy? Hong Kong Special Administrative Region, 1997–2002." Political Quarterly 73.4 (2002): 455–64. (with Ian Holliday and Ray Yep)
- "The Decline of the Democratic Party in Hong Kong: The Second Legislative Election in the HKSAR." Asian Survey 41.4 (2001): 564–83.
