= Goodwill Scholarships =

Goodwill Scholarships are college-level scholarships created and fully funded starting in 2003 by two private citizens in Prince William County, Virginia, to aid international students who study at the Northern Virginia Community College (NVCC).

Unlike most other scholarships available to students at American colleges, the Goodwill awards are limited to international students who have a 3.0 academic average and a demonstrated financial need. However, students being considered for awards do not need to fill out the Free Application for Federal Student Aid (FAFSA) form that is commonly required of U.S. citizens.

Normally, two students are recognized annually for these awards. The scholarship program is administered by the Northern Virginia Community College Educational Foundation, an adjunct to NVCC.

== See also ==
- EducationUSA
- AFS Intercultural Programs
- ERASMUS programme (European Union)
- Belgian American Educational Foundation (BAEF)
- Student exchange program
- International students
- Fulbright Fellowship
- Harkness Fellowship
- ITT International Fellowship Program
- Monbukagakusho Scholarship
