= Fulbright Austria =

The Austrian-American Educational Commission/ Fulbright Austria (AAEC) is one of the 50 bi-national commissions under the Fulbright Program, which exists in order to promote “mutual understanding between the people of the United States and the peoples of other countries.”

The program was established in 1946 as part of a bill dealing with the liquidation of surplus US assets left in Europe after World War II. Over 60 years later, the Fulbright Program has over 310,000 alumni and carries out its mission in 155 countries.

The Fulbright Program fulfills its mission of mutual understanding by facilitating the exchange of students and scholars between countries. The AAEC provides grants for US citizens to teach, engage in research or study in Austria, and offers Austrian citizens parallel opportunities in the United States. AAEC programs are primarily funded by direct contributions from the Austrian and American governments.

== Fulbright for US Citizens ==
=== US Students ===
The AAEC provides Fulbright grants for up to 20 recent undergraduates and graduate students from the US to study and engage in research in Austria. Applications from US citizens are first sent to the Institute of International Education in mid-October for pre-screening. Selected semifinalists' files are then sent on to the AAEC in Vienna, and a committee of Austrian and American academics chooses the grantees, who are informed of their selection by the end of April. According to their website, the AAEC offers 7 full research grants to students, as well as 12 combined grants, in which the grantee works 13 hours per week as an English teaching assistant in an Austrian secondary school in addition to studying at a university and conducting research.

=== US Scholars ===
The Austrian American Educational Commission awards Fulbright scholarships to scholars in diverse fields for various time periods, depending upon the individual grant and the strength of the applicant pool in that particular year.

According to the AAEC website, twelve joint awards were offered by Fulbright and its partner institutions in 2011-12, as well as one grant from the Fulbright 'core program' and a distinguished chair position. Positions and fields vary somewhat from year to year, due to funding and the fact that different universities host scholars and have varying departmental needs.

== Fulbright for Austrians ==
=== Austrian Students ===
The Austrian American Educational Commission offers up to 15 grants to Austrian students who wish to pursue a master's degree in the US. The AAEC considers applications in all fields except for business and medicine, and LLM law programs.

=== German Language Teaching Assistants ===
The Austrian American Educational Commission also offers up to 15 grants for Austrians to work as German language teaching assistants at US schools as part of the Fulbright Foreign Language Teaching Assistant program (FLTA). GLTAs work approximately 20 hours per week for the whole school year and can take classes at their host institutions.

=== Austrian Scholars ===
The Austrian American Educational Commission provides opportunities for Austrian scholars in various fields to teach and conduct research in the US. Positions and fields change from year to year, however there is generally a partnership with the University of Minnesota, the new Fulbright-Botstiber Award for American Studies, and a senior fellow at the IFK as well as general teach/research positions.

== Other AAEC Programs ==
=== United States Citizen Teaching Assistantships in Austria ===
Though not a Fulbright grant, the Austrian American Educational Commission/Fulbright Austria administers the United States Teaching Assistantship program (USTA) on behalf of the Austrian Federal Ministry of Education, Arts and Culture. USTAs are American citizens who have completed a bachelor's degree, are under 30 at the time of application, and have an interest in teaching German or English. The USTA program places approximately 145 teaching assistants in secondary schools across Austria, where the TAs provide a first-hand perspective on the 'American way of life' while assisting with English language skills. USTAs work in their schools for 13 hours per week, from October to the end of May.

=== EducationUSA Advising ===
The Austrian American Educational Commission also advises students at large about the US educational system. AAEC representatives can often be seen at university study-abroad fairs providing information about studying in the USA.

== Noted Alumni ==
- Chuck Close, American, hyperrealist painter: recipient of the National Medal of the Arts (2000), appointed by President Barack Obama to the President's Committee on the Arts and Humanities; Academy of Fine Arts Vienna
- Friedrich St. Florian, Austrian, designer of the US National World War II Memorial on the Mall in Washington D.C.; Columbia University
- Paul Harather, Austrian, director of "Indien;" American Film Institute
- Wilhelm Holzbauer, Austrian, noted modernist architect; MIT
- Stefan Sagmeister, Austrian, graphic designer: designed the Rolling Stones Bridges to Babylon and other cover art (see Category:Albums with cover art by Stefan Sagmeister), winner of 2 Grammy Awards; Pratt Institute
- Monsignor Peter Vaghi, American, Catholic priest: chaplain of the John Carroll Society, presided over the funeral of New York Senator Daniel Patrick Moynihan; University of Salzburg
- de:Hannelore Veit, Austrian, Journalist for ORF (broadcaster); Notre Dame
- Ruth Wodak, Austrian, Distinguished Professor and Chair in Discourse Studies at Lancaster University; Stanford University
