= Journal of International Students =

- Discipline: International education, International students
- Language: English
- Edited by: Krishna Bista

Publication details
- History: 2011–present
- Publisher: Independent (United States)
- Frequency: Quarterly
- Open access: yes
- Impact factor: 1.5 (2023)

Standard abbreviations
- ISO 4: J. Int. Stud.

Indexing
- ISSN: 2162-3104 (print); 2166-3750 (web)

Links
- Journal homepage

The Journal of International Students is a quarterly, peer-reviewed, open access, academic journal covering research on international students in tertiary education, secondary education, and other educational settings that make significant contributions to research, policy, and practice in the internationalization of education worldwide. JIS is part of the Star Scholars Network's Open Journals in Education

== Publication history ==
The Journal of International Students (JIS) was established in 2011 and is published on the Open Journals in Education (OJED) network by Krishna Bista while at Arkansas State University, now at Morgan State University. and the editor-in-chief was Chris R. Glass of Old Dominion University; Dr Glass resigned in November 2023 when the journal introduced a new editorial management team and article processing charges.

== Abstracting and indexing ==
The Journal of International Students (JIS) is abstracted and indexed in Scopus. JIS is a Gold Open Access journal.
