= Charles De Koninck =

Belgian-Canadian Thomist philosopher (1906–1965)

Charles De Koninck MSRC
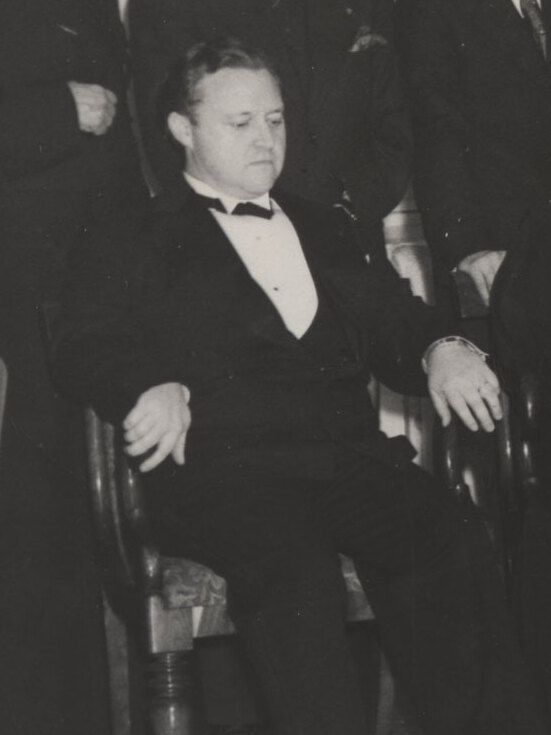
- De Koninck in 1945
- Born: 29 July 1906; Torhout, Belgium
- Died: 13 February 1965 (aged 58); Rome, Italy

Education
- Education: Catholic University of Louvain

Philosophical work
- Era: 20th-century philosophy
- Region: Western philosophy
- School: Laval Thomism
- Main interests: Philosophy of nature, political theory, philosophy of science, Philosophy of mathematics, metaphysics, logic, theology

Charles De Koninck MSRC (29 July 1906 – 13 February 1965) was a Belgian-Canadian Thomist philosopher and theologian. As director of the Department of Philosophy at the Université Laval in Quebec, he influenced Catholic philosophy in French Canada and also influenced Catholic philosophers in English Canada and the United States. The author of many books and articles in French and English, he contributed to a variety of philosophical fields including natural philosophy, philosophy of science, philosophy of mathematics, and political philosophy, but he also wrote on theology, especially Mariology.

De Koninck was the founder of the so-called Laval School of philosophy, and mentored a number of philosophers, including Ralph McInerny, who published an English translation of De Koninck's collected works.

== Early life and education ==
De Koninck was born in Torhout, Belgium, the son of Louis De Koninck and Marie Verplancke, both natives of Torhout. In 1914, the De Koninck family emigrated to the United States, where Louis De Koninck worked as a builder and contractor in Detroit, Michigan.

In 1921 Charles returned to Belgium to complete his education. He first went to school in Ostend, where he studied mainly mathematics, chemistry, and physics, but where he also read widely in Latin, Greek, Dutch, and English Literature. He then studied philosophy at the Catholic University of Louvain, where he became a Thomist. After attending the University of Detroit, he returned to Louvain and earned a doctorate summa cum laude with a dissertation on Sir Arthur Eddington's philosophy of science.

== Career ==
In 1934, De Koninck began work at the Université Laval in Quebec, where he became a full professor the following year, a position which he held for the rest of his life. Between 1939 and 1956 he was dean of the faculty of philosophy at Laval.

As a member of the Royal Society of Canada, De Koninck and his family hosted and entertained many well-known people in their Quebec City residence, among them Antoine de Saint-Exupéry and his writer-artist wife, Consuelo Suncín during their five-week stay in the province in the spring of 1942. The De Konincks' eight-year-old son, Thomas De Koninck, whom Saint-Exupéry met, may have served as an inspiration for the extraterrestrial visitor of his well-known novella, The Little Prince.

== Philosophy of nature ==
De Koninck devoted a good portion of his philosophical work to the philosophy of nature. De Koninck's graduate career at Louvain led him to write a dissertation under Fernand Renoirte, himself a philosopher of science, on the philosophy of Sir Arthur Eddington. His dissertation attempted to parlay between classical Thomistic philosophy and Eddington's philosophy of science, shaped by recent developments in relativity theory and quantum theory.

While De Koninck's initial view of the relationship between philosophy and the experimental sciences followed a separatist line akin to that of Jacques Maritain, a later development in his thinking portrayed the modern sciences as "dialectical extensions" of metaphysics and, more proximately, the philosophy of nature. Over the course of his career, De Koninck published articles addressing overlapping issues in classical Aristotelian and Thomistic philosophy and quantum indeterminism, the biological sciences, the foundation of mathematical physics, and the philosophy of mathematics. The most accessible introduction to his thought in the philosophy of nature and science is his Whidden Lectures of 1959, published as a collection titled The Hollow Universe. In the three lectures, De Koninck addresses the philosophical foundations, content, and implications of three modern scientific inquiries: modern mathematics ("The World of Symbolic Construction, or Two is One Twice Over"), physics ("Mental Construction and the Test of Experience"), and biology ("The Lifeless World of Biology"). The epilogue to the book, "Reckoning with the Computers," extends the theme of the hollow universe from the realm of mathematics, physics, and biology to the account of man himself. Scholar Leslie Armour maintains that "our place as knowing beings suggests to De Koninck that nature and knowing beings are so designed as to go together, and so designed as to be unintelligible without one another."

== Critique of personalism ==
Along with Henri Grenier and Louis Lachance, De Koninck was a prominent Thomist critic of personalism. De Koninck's book On the Primacy of the Common Good: Against the Personalists criticized personalist thinkers for claiming that the common good ought to be subordinate to the private good of persons. De Koninck did not name the personalists whom he had in mind, but Yves Simon and I. Th. Eschmann assumed that he was thinking of Jacques Maritain. Yves Simon agreed with De Koninck's rejection of the subordination of the common good to the person but denied that it applied to Maritain. Eschmann, on the other hand, defended the subordination of the common good to the person and claimed that this was in fact taught by Maritain.

== Death ==
De Koninck died in Rome in 1965 while serving as an advisor to Cardinal Maurice Roy at the Second Vatican Council. He was survived by his wife and 11 children.

== Main books ==
- Le cosmos, Québec, Pro Manuscripto, 1936.
- Ego Sapientia, Montréal/Québec, Fides/Éditions de l'Université Laval, 1943 (translated in Spanish).
- De la primauté du bien commun contre les personnalistes. Le principe de l'ordre nouveau, Montréal/Québec, Fides/Éditions de l'Université Laval, 1943.
- La piété du Fils, 1954.
- The Hollow Universe, London, Oxford University Press, 1960 (translated in Spanish and reedited in French at the Presses de l'Université Laval).
- Le scandale de la médiation, Paris, Nouvelles Éditions latines, 1962.
- Tout homme est mon prochain, Québec, Presses de l'Université Laval, 1964.
