= Ministry of Education, Culture, Sports, Science and Technology =

Government ministry of Japan

- 文部科学省; Monbu-kagaku-shō

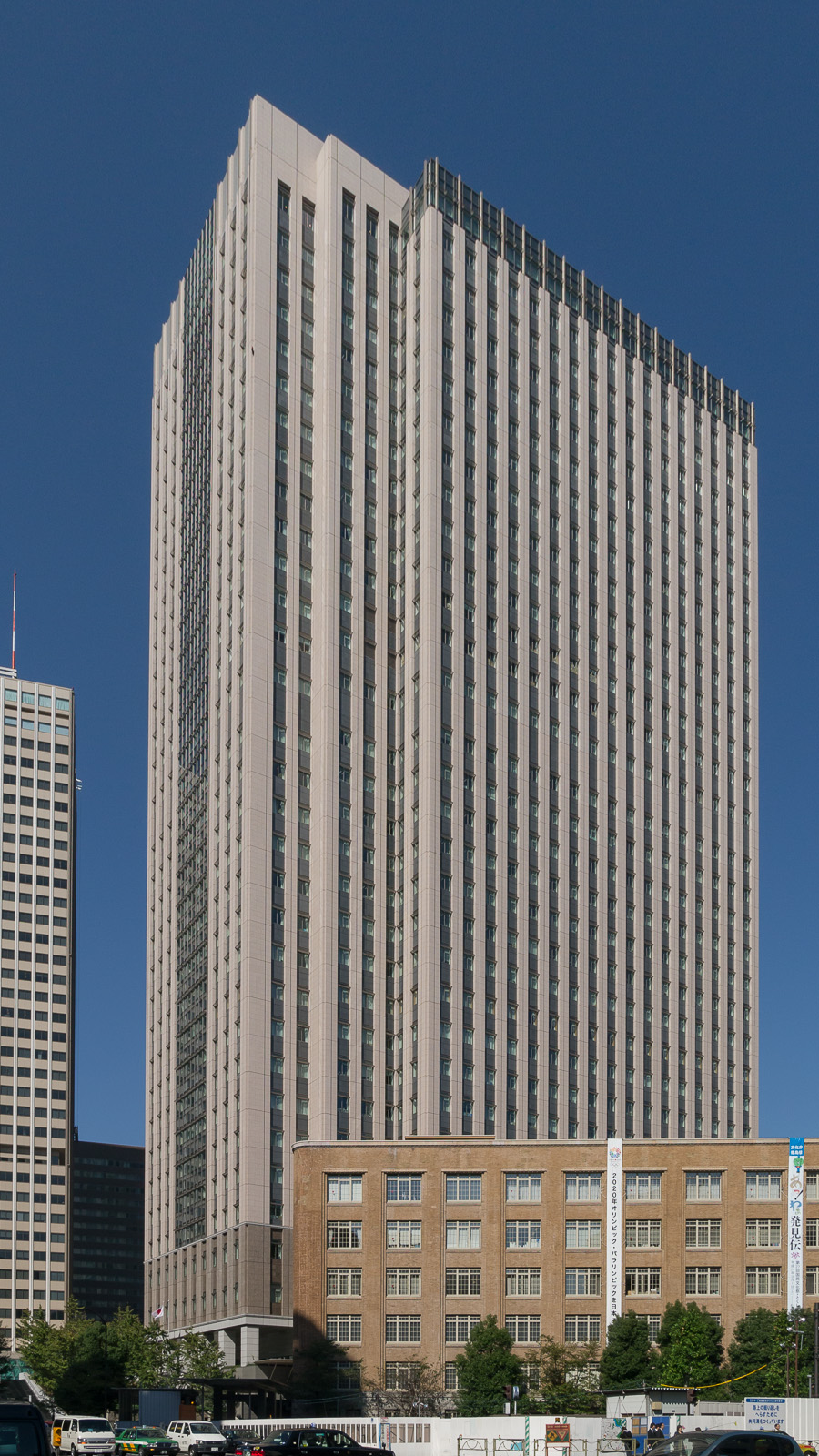
- Headquarters

Agency overview
- Formed: January 6, 2001
- Preceding agencies: Ministry of Education, Science, Sports and Culture; Science and Technology Agency
- Jurisdiction: Government of Japan
- Headquarters: 3–2–2 Kasumigaseki, Chiyoda-ku, Tokyo 100-8959, Japan; 35.680°N 139.763°E
- Minister responsible: Yoshihiro Seki
- Child agencies: Agency for Cultural Affairs; Japan Sports Agency
- Website: mext.go.jp/en

The Ministry of Education, Culture, Sports, Science and Technology (文部科学省, Monbu-kagaku-shō; lit. 'Ministry of Letters and Science'; MEXT) is one of the eleven ministries of Japan that compose part of the executive branch of the government of Japan.

== History ==
The Meiji government created the first Ministry of Education in 1871. In January 2001, the former Ministry of Education, Science, Sports and Culture and the former Science and Technology Agency (科学技術庁, Kagaku-gijutsu-chō) merged to become the present MEXT.

== Organization ==
The Ministry of Education, Culture, Sports, Science and Technology currently is led by the minister of education, culture, sports, science and technology. Under that position is two state ministers, two parliamentary vice-ministers, and administrative vice-minister, and two deputy ministers. Beyond that the organization is divided as follows.

=== Minister's Secretariat ===
The Minister's Secretariat is the department that manages general policies that affect the Ministry of Education, Culture, Sports, Science and Technology as a whole. These functions include many administrative jobs such as auditing policies, community relations, and overall human resource management for domestic and international relations alike.

=== Director-General for International Affairs ===
The Director-General for International Affairs, according to Ministry of Education, Culture, Sports, Science and Technology's site, is the main point of contact between Japan's National Commission and United Nations Educational Scientific and Cultural Organization (UNESCO). The collective goal of the two organizations is to create mutual, sustainable development through education, science, and culture.

=== Department of Facilities Planning and Disaster Prevention ===
The Department of Facilities Planning and Disaster Prevention is in charge of focusing on the ability of school facilities to reduce damage caused by disasters such as earthquakes. On top of this, Ministry of Education, Culture, Sports, Science and Technology's site, also describes part of their duties as promoting universities' endeavors in educational and research activities.

== Education departments ==
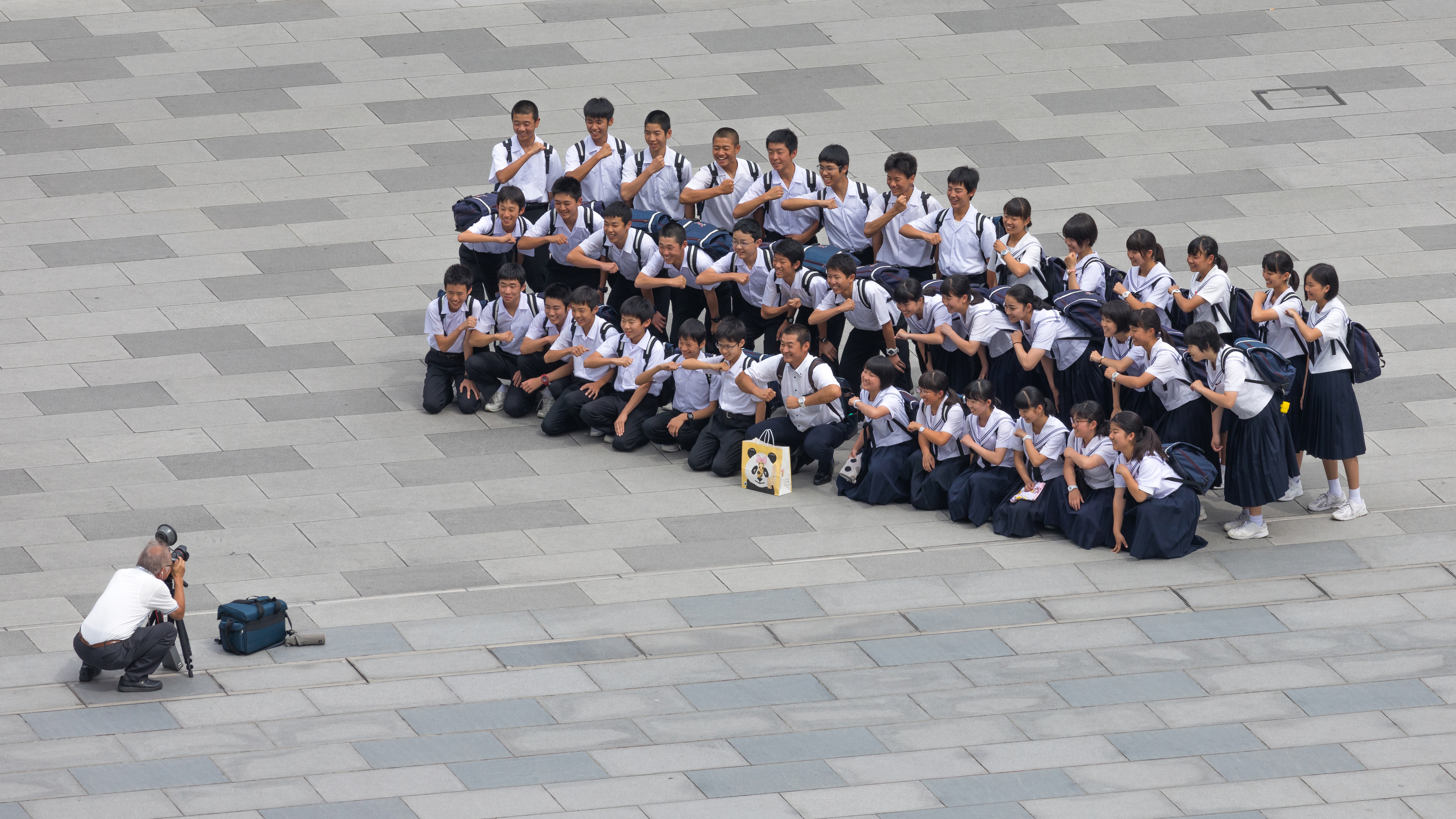
Japanese students in front of Tokyo station, Marunouchi

These are the segments of the ministry with focus on the education portions of organization.

=== Education Policy Bureau ===
The Education Policy Bureau as a department upholds the concept of lifelong learning, introduced in the Basic Act on Education. Ministry of Education, Culture, Sports, Science and Technology describes this department's duties as designing educational policy based on comprehensive and objective evidence.

=== Elementary and Secondary Education Bureau ===
The Elementary and Secondary Education Bureau is in charge of enhancing the educational development of students progressing through preschool to upper secondary schools, or any equivalent.

=== Higher Education Bureau ===
The Ministry of Education, Culture, Sports, Science and Technology describes the Higher Education Bureau as a department that focuses on promoting the education of undergraduate and graduate schools. This includes overseeing permission of grants, teacher quality, as well as the selection and admission of both domestic and abroad students.

== Sports and culture departments ==
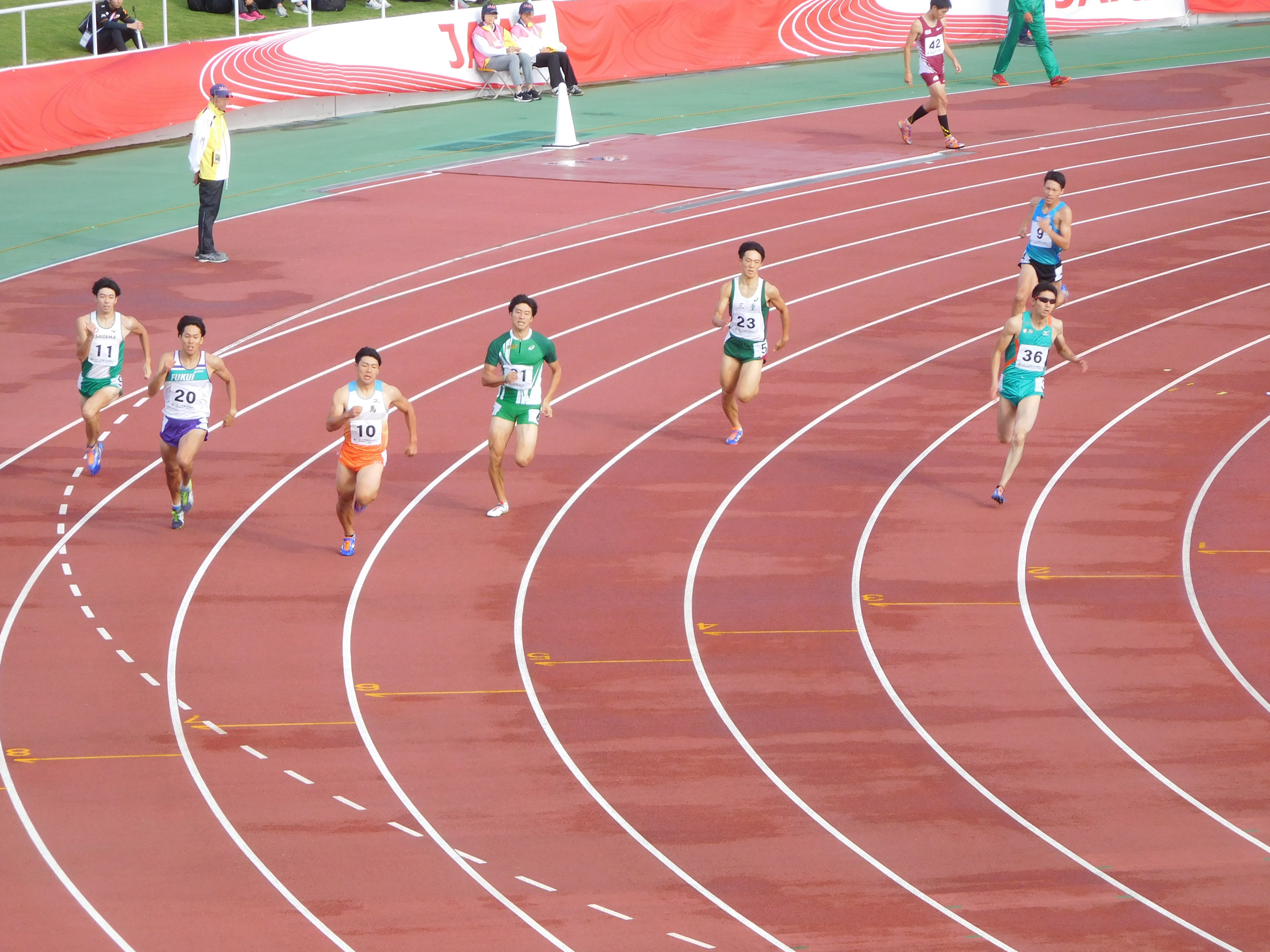
74th National Sports Festival of Japan, during a 400-meter race

These are the segments of the ministry with focus on the sports and culture portions of organization.

=== Japan Sports Agency ===
The Japan Sports Agency is tasked with the promotion of physical education and health, as well as maintaining the country's ability to compete in international athletics.

=== Agency for Cultural Affairs ===
The Japanese Agency for Cultural Affairs tries to create a culture in the country that encourages participation in cultural activities and the arts. Their goal is to achieve a "Nation Based on Culture and Art".

== Science and technology departments ==
These are the segments of the ministry with focus on the science and technology portions of organization.

=== Science and Technology Policy Bureau ===
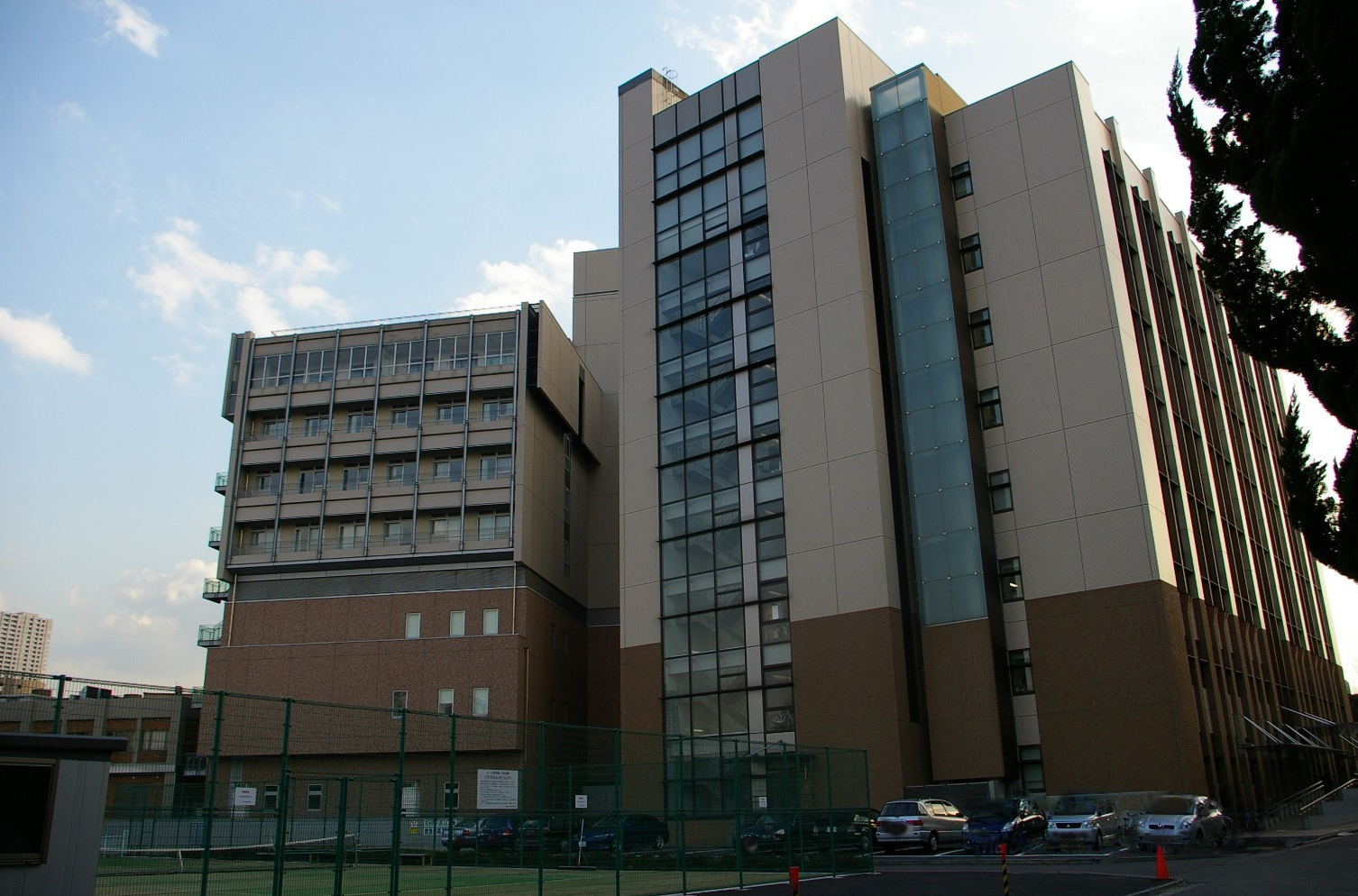
The Institute of Medical Science Tokyo Japan General Research Building 0104

The Ministry of Education, Culture, Sports, Science and Technology's site regards the duties of the Science and Technology Policy Bureau as the department in charge of the promotion of science and technology in the country. The scope of the department includes students as well as established professionals.

=== Research Promotion Bureau ===
The Research Promotion Bureau is a department that focuses on development of scientific research, as well as research in fields including technology and physics.

=== Research and Development Bureau ===
The Research and Development Bureau is slightly different from the Research Promotion Bureau as this department focuses on social problems including energy and the environment. Consequentially, this department would focus on exploration in space and deep sea.

== Activities and funded research ==
While the Ministry of Education, Culture, Sports, Science and Technology currently contains multiple agencies, primarily a congregation of Education, Culture, Sports, Science and Technology, it actually began as the Ministry of Education. Over the years, Japan separately created each of the agencies that would eventually combine to make the current organization. Nonetheless, each department of the Ministry of Education, Culture, Sports, Science and Technology researches programs and institutions to fund.

=== Educational research ===
The Ministry of Education, Culture, Sports, Science and Technology, were able to get their funding increased successfully through the years. They did so with the aid of one of their subgroups, the Japan Society for the Promotion of Science. The additional funds were likely aided in approval due to their source coming from national bonds rather than taxes. The programs, funded by the increased budget, include projects in new materials, molecular-scale surface dynamics, next-generation process technology, computer science, synthesis-based chemical engineering science, micro-mechatronics (micromachinery), biotechnology, human genome research, cell signaling, bioinformatics, brain research, Structural biology, life sciences, developmental biology, and biomedical engineering.

== Educational programs ==
MEXT is one of three ministries that run the JET Programme. It also offers the Monbukagakusho Scholarship, also known as the MEXT or Monbu-shō scholarship. The Ministry sets standards for the romanization of Japanese.

In cooperation with the Japanese Student Services Organization (JASSO), the ministry further funds the prestigious JASSO scholarship for international students which has been described as the "Japanese Fulbright program". It offers financial support of up to ¥80,000 per month for the top 1% of students of any foreign country for studies at a Japanese university.

MEXT provides the Children Living Abroad and Returnees Internet (CLARINET) which provides information to Japanese families living abroad.

MEXT sends teachers around the world to serve in nihonjin gakkō, full-time Japanese international schools in foreign countries. The Japanese government also sends full-time teachers to hoshū jugyō kō supplementary schools that offer lessons that are similar to those of nihonjin gakkō or those which each have student bodies of 100 students or greater. In addition, MEXT subsidizes weekend schools which each have over 100 students.

Japanese Government MEXT scholarship 2022 Japanese Government MEXT Scholarship 2021 Embassy Recommendation. The scholarship programs are for students who wish to study in Japan as Research Student (Masters/Ph.D./ Research), Undergraduate student, College of Technology student, or Specialized Training student.

== See also ==
- National Spiritual Mobilization Movement
- Education in Japan
  - Fundamental Law of Education
  - History of education in Japan
- Japanese history textbook controversies
- Monbukagakusho Scholarship
