= Paul De Grauwe =

Belgian economist

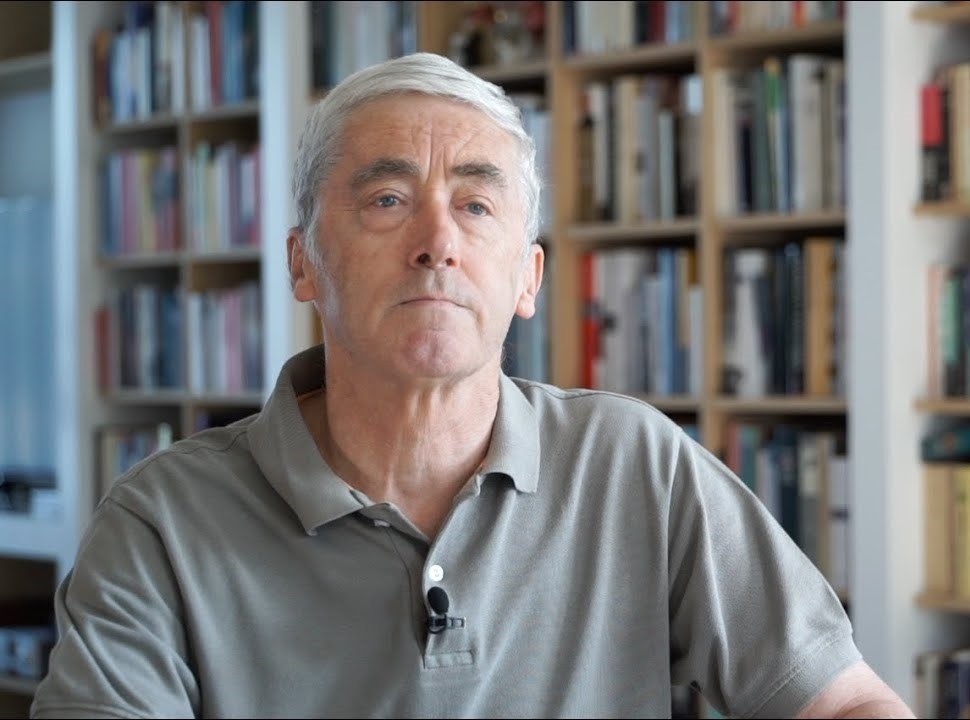
- Born: 18 July 1946 (age 80); Uccle, Belgium
- Education: Johns Hopkins University, Katholieke Universiteit Leuven
- Awards: Prize of the European Communities (1976), Amex Bank Review Award (1990), Ark Prize of Free Speech (2013)
- Scientific career
- Fields: International economics, Monetary economics, European economy
- Workplaces: London School of Economics, KU Leuven
- Thesis: The interaction of monetary policies in a group of European countries. (1973)

Paul De Grauwe (Dutch pronunciation: [ˈpʌul də ˈɣrʌuə]; born 18 July 1946) is a Belgian economist and John Paulson Professor in European Political Economy at the London School of Economics and Political Science. He is also professor emeritus in international economics at KU Leuven and former member of the Belgian Federal Parliament.

== Education and career ==
De Grauwe went to High School in the Klein Seminarie Roeselare, and studied economics at the Catholic University of Leuven from 1964 until 1969. Having received a scholarship from the Belgian Fulbright Commission, De Grauwe obtained his PhD degree at Johns Hopkins University in 1973. He started to work as an intern at the European Economic Community in 1969 and later went on to become a research assistant, and subsequently a professor at the Center for Economic Studies of the Katholieke Universiteit Leuven.

In 1973, De Grauwe began to work as an economist at the International Monetary Fund and accepted positions at the Centre for European Policy Studies and the European Central Bank. He has also been professor at the College of Europe, the Free University of Berlin, and BI Norwegian Business School. Furthermore, he has been a visiting scholar at the University of Michigan, Tilburg University, Wharton School of the University of Pennsylvania, Kiel University, Bank of Japan, Université libre de Bruxelles, Saarland University, Ghent University, the Catholic University of Portugal, the Federal Reserve Board of Governors, the University of Amsterdam, Humboldt University of Berlin, and Università Cattolica del Sacro Cuore. In addition, De Grauwe has been given doctoral honorary degrees at the University of St. Gallen, the University of Valencia, the Turku School of Economics, and the University of Genoa.

From 1991 to 1995 and from 1999 to 2003, Paul De Grauwe was a member of the Belgian Senate, and from 1995 until 1999 he became a member of parliament in the Belgian Chamber of Representatives. In both houses of parliament, he was part of the Flemish Liberals and Democrats.

He is editor of various economic academic journals and a former member of the Group of Economic Policy Analysis advising the European Commission President José Manuel Barroso, as well as director of the money, macro and international finance research network of CESifo at LMU Munich. He has had a column in the Financial Times. Belgian media often make use of his expertise when dealing with current economic affairs, primarily with regard to European economic and monetary issues. Besides hundreds of scientific articles, he has published various books as well. Furthermore, he is co-editor and author of economic textbooks in both Dutch and English. He is the author of The Economics of Monetary Union, which was translated in ten languages. From December 2011 until May 2012, De Grauwe served as member of the Jacques Delors Institute’s Tommaso Padoa-Schioppa group, a high-level expert group to reflect on the reform of the Economic and Monetary Union of the European Union.

In 2012, De Grauwe reached the legal age for mandatory retirement in Belgium, after which he was offered the John Paulson Chair in European Political Economy at the London School of Economics and Political Science and retired from his position at KU Leuven. He has expressed his discontent with the legal retirement age: I felt disparaged, like an old machine in a factory. Our [Belgian] legislation says: "you have become economically worthless," but I also felt struck in my identity as a person. You have to give people the freedom of choice if they want to continue working after their 65th [birthday], end of story. I understand those who feel exhausted and quit, but I wanted to continue functioning academically and this wasn't an option here [in Belgium].

== Recognition ==
In May 2013, De Grauwe was awarded the Arkprijs van het Vrije Woord (Ark Prize of Free Speech). He is also a fellow of the European Economic Association.

== Market ideology ==
As a liberal and advocate of the free market De Grauwe has long time been a strong proponent of the market economy and globalisation. In De onvoltooide globalisering (The Uncompleted Globalisation), written for a broader audience, he explains why he favors globalisation and discusses the statements of anti-globalists, which he finds somewhat pessimistic. He sees himself as an optimist and believes that market forces and economic growth will offer a solution to the issues related to natural resources, energy, environment and climate.

However, in 2011, De Grauwe pointed out the necessity of government in this market economy. He said he used to uphold financial markets as bearers of the truth but now acknowledges that it is a world where rationality is intertwined with emotions. In an interview, he stated that certain entities are needed to correct market forces. Because of the 2008 financial crisis, the need to correct the market was greater than before. For this reason his acknowledgement of a strong government has increased.

In the context of the COVID-19 pandemic crisis, De Grauwe was also in favour of direct monetary financing of government spending by the European Central Bank.

== Selected publications ==
- "The limits of markets", Oxford: Oxford University Press, 2017.
- "Economics of Monetary Union" (Ed.), Oxford: Oxford University Press, 2012.
- "Animal spirits and monetary policy", Economic Theory, vol. 47, no. 2, 2011, pp. 423 – 442.
- "The Return of Keynes", International Finance, vol. 13, no. 1, 2010, pp. 157 – 163.
- "The Fragility of the Eurozone’s Institutions", Open Economies Review, vol. 21, no. 1, 2010, pp. 167 – 174.
- "What have we learnt about monetary integration since the Maastricht Treaty?", Journal of Common Market Studies, vol. 44, no. 4, 2006, pp. 711 – 730.
- "Prospects for monetary unions after the Euro", Cambridge, MA: The MIT Press, 2005.

With others

- De Grauwe, P; Ji, Y. (February 21, 2013). "Panic-driven austerity in the Eurozone and its implications". Vox EU.
- De Grauwe, P., & Kaltwasser, P. R. (2012). "The Exchange Rate in Behavioral Framework". In James, J., Marsh, I., & Sarno, L. (Eds.) The Handbook of Exchange Rates, Wiley.
- Altavilla C., & De Grauwe, P. (2010). "Non-Linearities in the Relation Between the Exchange Rate and the Fundamentals", International Research Journal of Finance and Economics, vol. 15, pp. 1 – 21.
- De Grauwe, P., Moesen, W. (2009). "Gains for all: a proposal for a common euro bond", Intereconomics, vol. 33, no. 3, pp. 132 – 141.
- De Grauwe, P., & Senegas, M. (2006). "Monetary policy design and transmission asymmetry in EMU: Does uncertainty matter?", European journal of political economy, vol. 22, no. 4, pp. 787 – 808.
- De Grauwe, P., & Zhang, Z. (2006). "Introduction: Monetary and economic integration in the East Asian region", World economy, vol. 29, no. 12, pp. 1643 – 1647.
- Aksoy, Y., De Grauwe, P., & Dewachter, H. (2002). "Do asymmetries matter for European monetary policy?", European Economic Review, vol. 46, no. 3, pp. 443 – 469.
