= Henri Grenier =

Canadian Catholic priest and philosopher (1899–1980)

Henri Grenier (20 May 1899 – 5 May 1980) was a Canadian priest, theologian, and philosopher. He was the author of a manual of Thomistic philosophy, once widely used in Catholic seminaries.

== Life ==
Grenier was born in Gaspé, Quebec, and ordained for the diocese of Gaspé in 1924. He studied philosophy at the Angelicum in Rome (1924-1926), and at the major seminary in Gaspé (1926-1927). From 1927-1930 he studied theology at the Angelicum and Canon law at the Pontifical Lateran University. He held doctorates in philosophy, theology, and canon law. From 1930 to 1947 he was professor of theology at the seminary of Québec. In 1938 he was incardinated in the diocese of Québec. He spent a year in Oklahoma, 1944-1945. He was for many years professor of philosophy at the Université Laval.

== Work ==
Grenier's Cursus Philosophiae was originally written in Latin, and was then translated into French and English. Gavan Monaghan called the publication of the Cursus "a milestone in the teaching of thomistic philosophy." The Thomist praised the Cursus for adhering faithfully to "the mind and teaching of St. Thomas and Aristotle." Along with Charles De Koninck and Louis Lachance, Grenier was a prominent Thomist critic of personalism.
