= Ralph McInerny =

American philosophy professor

- Born: Ralph Matthew McInerny; February 24, 1929; Minneapolis, Minnesota, U.S.
- Died: January 29, 2010 (aged 80); Mishawaka, Indiana, U.S.
- Resting place: Cedar Grove Cemetery, Notre Dame, Indiana.
- Occupations: Religious scholar, author
- Spouse: Constance Kunert (m. 1953)
- Children: 7
- Writing career
- Pen name: Harry Austin, Matthew FitzRalph, Ernan Mackey, Edward Mackin, Monica Quill
- Notable work: Father Dowling mysteries

Ralph Matthew McInerny (February 24, 1929 – January 29, 2010) was an American author and philosophy professor at the University of Notre Dame. McInerny's most popular mystery novels featured Father Dowling, and was later adapted into the Father Dowling Mysteries television show, which ran from 1987 to 1991.

He sometimes wrote under the pseudonyms of Harry Austin, Matthew FitzRalph, Ernan Mackey, Edward Mackin and Monica Quill.

== Academic career ==
McInerny wrote his PhD dissertation entitled The Existential Dialectic of Soren Kierkegaard under Professor Charles De Koninck at Laval University in Quebec, Canada.

He was Professor of Philosophy, Director of the Jacques Maritain Center, and Michael P. Grace Professor of Medieval Studies at the University of Notre Dame. He taught there from 1955 until his retirement in 2009.

McInerny was also a Fulbright Scholar, receiving educational funds from the Fulbright Commission Belgium. He served as president of the Metaphysical Society of America in 1993.

McInerny's brother Dennis, also a philosophy professor, believes that his brother's greatest legacy is not to be found in his novels, but in his adherence to scholastic and Thomistic beliefs.

== Personal life ==
McInerny was a Catholic. He attended Nazareth Hall Preparatory Seminary for high school. He married the former Constance Kunert January 3, 1953, in Minneapolis, Minnesota. She preceded him in death on May 18, 2002. The McInernys had four daughters and three sons, one of whom, Michael, predeceased Ralph.

McInerny died of esophageal cancer on January 29, 2010.

== Bibliography ==
=== Fiction ===
==== Father Dowling ====
- Her Death of Cold (1977)
- Bishop as Pawn (1978)
- The Seventh Station (1977)
- Lying Three (1979)
- The Second Vespers (1980)
- Thicker Than Water (1981)
- A Loss of Patients (1982)
- The Grass Widow (1983)
- Getting a Way with Murder (1984)
- Rest in Pieces (1985)
- The Basket Case (1987)
- Slight of Body (1989; aka Abracadaver)
- Four on the Floor (1989)
- Abracadaver (1989)
- Judas Priest (1991)
- Desert Sinner (1992)
- Seed of Doubt (1993)
- A Cardinal Offense (1994)
- The Case of the Constant Caller (young adult) (1995)
- The Case of the Dead Winner (young adult) (1995)
- The Tears of Things (1996)
- Grave Undertakings (2000)
- Triple Pursuit (2001)
- Prodigal Father (2002)
- Last Things (2003)
- Requiem for a Realtor (2004)
- Blood Ties (2005)
- The Prudence of Flesh (2006)
- The Widow's Mate (2007)
- Ash Wednesday (2008)
- The Wisdom of Father Dowling (2009)
- Stained Glass (2009)
- The Compassion of Father Dowling (short stories) (2011)

==== Sister Mary Teresa (all as Monica Quill) ====
- Not a Blessed Thing (1981)
- Let Us Prey (1982)
- And Then There Was Nun (1984)
- Nun of the Above (1985)
- Sine Qua Nun (1986)
- The Veil of Ignorance (1988)
- Sister Hood (1991)
- Nun Plussed (1993)
- Half Past Nun (1997)
- Death Takes the Veil (2001)

==== Andrew Broom ====
- Cause and Effect (1987)
- Body and Soil (1989)
- Savings and Loam (1990)
- Mom and Dead (1994)
- Law and Ardor (1995)
- Heirs and Parents (2000)

==== Notre Dame ====
- On This Rockne (1997)
- Lack of the Irish (1998)
- Irish Tenure (1999)
- The Book of Kills (2000)
- Emerald Aisle (2001)
- Celt and Pepper (2002)
- Irish Coffee (2003)
- Green Thumb (2004)
- Irish Gilt (2005)
- The Letter Killeth (2006)
- Irish Alibi (2007)
- The Green Revolution (2008)
- Sham Rock (2010)

==== Rosary Chronicles ====
- The Third Revelation (2009)
- Relic of Time (2009)

==== Other novels ====
- Jolly Rogerson (1967)
- A Narrow Time (1969)
- The Priest (1973)
- The Gate of Heaven (1975)
- Rogerson at Bay (1976)
- Romanesque (1977)
- Spinnaker (1978)
- Quick as a Dodo (1978)
- Connolly's Life (1983)
- The Noonday Devil (1985)
- Leave of Absence (1986)
- Frigor Mortis (1989)
- The Nominative Case (as by Edward Mackin) (1990)
- Easeful Death (1991)
- The Search Committee (1991)
- Infra Dig (1992)
- The Red Hat (1998)
- As Good As Dead (2002)
- The Ablative Case (2003)
- Slattery (2004)

==== Collections ====
- Thou Shalt Not Kill: Father Brown, Father Dowling And Other Ecclesiastical Sleuths (with G. K. Chesterton and John Mortimer) (1992)
- Good Knights (2009)

==== Poetry ====
- The Soul of Wit: Some Poems (2005)

==== Anthologies edited ====
- Murder Most Divine (with Martin Harry Greenberg) (2000)
- Murder Most Catholic (with Martin Harry Greenberg) (2002)
- Great Mystery Series: 11 of the Best Mystery Short Stories from Alfred Hitchcock's And Ellery Queen's Mystery Magazines (with Lawrence Block and Mary Higgins Clark) (2000)

=== Non-fiction ===
==== Philosophy and theology ====
- A History of Western Philosophy with A. Robert Caponigri (1963 - 1971)
- New Themes in Christian Philosophy (1969)
- Thomism in an Age of Renewal (1969)
- St. Thomas Aquinas (1977)
- Miracles: A Catholic View (1986)
- Art and Prudence: Studies in the Thought of Jacques Maritain (1988)
- A First Glance at St. Thomas Aquinas: A Handbook for Peeping Thomists (1990)
- Aquinas on Human Action: A Theory of Practice (1992)
- The Question of Christian Ethics, Catholic University of America Press (1993)
- Aquinas Against the Averroists: On There Being Only One Intellect (1993)
- Ethica Thomistica: The Moral Philosophy of Thomas Aquinas, Washington: Catholic University of America Press (1997)
- What Went Wrong with Vatican II?: The Catholic Crisis Explained (1998)
- Aquinas and Analogy, Catholic University of America Press (1999)
- Introduction to the Summa Theologiae of Thomas Aquinas. The Isagogue of John of St. Thomas. Translation and introduction by Ralph McInerny, St. Augustine's Press (2004)
- Praeambula Fidei, Catholic University of America Press (2006)
- The Writings of Charles De Koninck. Volume One (edition and translation), with an introduction by Leslie Armour and a biography by Thomas De Koninck, Notre Dame University Press, 2008
- The Writings of Charles De Koninck. Volume Two (edition and translation), Notre Dame, Notre Dame University Press, 2009
- Dante and the Blessed Virgin (2010)

==== Biography ====
- The Very Rich Hours of Jacques Maritain: A Spiritual Life (2003)
- I Alone Have Escaped to Tell You: My Life and Pastimes (2006)
- Some Catholic Writers (2006)
- The Defamation of Pope Pius XII (2001)

==== Instruction ====
- Let's Write a Novel (1993)
- Let's Write Short Stories (1993)
- Let's Read Latin: Introduction to the Language of the Church (1995)
- Characters in Search of Their Author: The Gifford Lectures, 1999–2000 (delivered at the University of Glasgow) (2001)
