= John Carroll Society =

Catholic lay organization

- Formation: 1951; 75 years ago
- Type: Catholic lay organization
- Legal status: active
- President: David Florenzo
- Parent organization: Catholic Church
- Website: www.johncarrollsociety.org

The John Carroll Society was founded in Washington, D.C., in 1951 as a spiritual and beneficent organization for Catholic professional laypersons in the service of the archbishop of the Archdiocese of Washington. The founders of the society were Secretary of the Navy John L. Sullivan, Judge Matthew Francis McGuire of the United States District Court for the District of Columbia, and attorney William E. Leahy.

Part of the John Carroll Society's mission is the financial and professional support of the Archdiocese Legal Network and Medical Network, which provides free legal and medical services to the indigent of the Greater Washington, DC area.

The current president is Jeff Paravano. Magistrate Judge John M. Facciola served as a president and is the chair of the Social Action Committee, which is active in assisting homeless and transitional families in the District of Columbia. Other prominent members include the current president of Georgetown University, and many partners of the private bar with most major large Washington, D.C. law firms. The chaplain of the society is Msgr. Peter Vaghi. Colleen Mudlaff is the Executive Director.

The group was meant to mirror the Catholic Alumni Society of Boston. It is named for John Carroll, the first bishop then archbishop in the United States. The society sponsors the annual Red Mass, which is a Mass of the Holy Spirit to invoke a benediction upon the nation's judiciary and lawgivers. This is celebrated on the Sunday before the first Monday in October, prior to the opening of the Supreme Court's judicial year.
