= Interamerican University Studies Institute =

US and Latin American education exchange program

IUSI
- Type: Non-profit educational organization
- Active: 1986–2010
- Students: 2,000+
- Location: Eugene, Oregon, United States Office in Mexico: Santiago de Querétaro, Querétaro Mexico
- Website: iusi.org

The Interamerican University Studies Institute (IUSI) was a nonprofit educational and cultural exchange program. It was established in 1986 to address the need for better understanding among the peoples of the U.S. and Latin America. It transferred its main programs to the Oregon University System's International Office in 2009, and shut down its operations in 2010.

== History ==
Founded in 1986, the goal of nonprofit Interamerican University Studies Institute (IUSI) was to promote academic learning and cross-cultural integration between US and Latin American peoples. IUSI sponsored more than 2,000 US citizens in the city of Querétaro, Mexico, and in Costa Rica. The institute conducted successful programs with Dartmouth College, Middlebury College, Westmont College, the University of Oregon, the University of Mississippi, Northern Arizona University, the University of Mary Hardin–Baylor, and the Catholic University of America. Its primary institutional partners in Querétaro include the Universidad Autónoma de Querétaro, the Queretaro Museum of Art, and the Centro de Educación Artística, an arts-based public high school under the national Instituto de Bellas Artes.

The IUSI transferred its principal programs to the Oregon University System's International Office in 2009, and shut down its operations in 2010.

== Academics ==
Participants were recruited nationally for courses that ran from one week to a full college semester.

IUSI provided intensive Spanish language and cultural immersion programs for undergraduate and graduate-level college students. It also administered two high school programs, Artes en México and ¡Pura Vida!, an intensive field biology program in the Costa Rican rainforest, for student ages fifteen to seventeen.

IUSI sponsored the participation of Mexican high school students in a summer jazz music camp in Oregon. It held a binational workshop in literary translation for Mexican and US participants. In collaboration with the University of Oregon, it offered a new graduate seminar in Mexican literature and language. In 1997, IUSI started a program that provided experiences in Querétaro for participants of the Learning in Retirement center in Eugene, Oregon.

== Governance ==
IUSI's board of directors included Alicia Andreu, Araceli Ardón, David Curland, Juan Armando Epple, Robert M. Jackson, and Fernando de Necochea. Jackson was head of the organization The organization was headquartered in Santiago de Querétaro, Querétaro, Mexico and in Eugene, Oregon, US.
