= Fung Wai-kong =

Fung Wai-kong (Chinese: 馮偉光; born 1964–65) is a Hong Kong journalist and media professional. He graduated from the Department of Social Sciences at New Asia College of The Chinese University of Hong Kong in 1985, and in 1988 obtained a Master of Philosophy in Journalism from the same university, later earning a Master of Arts in International Studies. In 1989, he worked as a reporter for the semi-monthly magazine "Common People". (Note: Chinese 《百姓》) From 1997, he wrote editorials for Apple Daily under the pen name "Lo Fung," and in 2020 he returned to the paper as managing editor and editorial writer of its English edition. He also contributed columns to Citizen News.

On 27 June 2021, Fung was arrested by the Hong Kong Police Force's National Security Department at Hong Kong International Airport while preparing to board a flight to the United Kingdom, on suspicion of colluding with foreign forces. His arrest brought the total number of people detained in connection with the Apple Daily case to 13. He was granted bail on 29 June with bail set at HK$200,000, but his bail was later revoked along with that of executive editor-in-chief Lam Man-chung, associate publisher Chan Pui-man, and lead editorial writer Yeung Ching-kee. Fung and Lam ultimately withdrew their bail review applications.

The Hong Kong Journalists Association condemned Fung Wai-kong's arrest, describing him as the second Apple Daily editorial writer arrested after Yeung Ching-kee. The association argued that the arrests severely undermined press freedom and freedom of expression in Hong Kong, warning that a city that could no longer tolerate critical writers would lose its standing as an international city. It accused authorities of using "national security" as a pretext to target journalists.

On 9 February 2026, under the Hong Kong national security law, Fung was sentenced for "conspiracy to collude with foreign forces." The court set a starting point of 15 years’ imprisonment. As he pleaded guilty, his sentence was reduced by one-third to 10 years. Designated national security judge Esther Toh stated that this was the minimum sentence. (CACC75/2026 [HCCC52/2022])
