= Peter Vaghi =

American priest, lawyer, & writer (1948-)

Peter Vaghi is an American Catholic priest in the Archdiocese of Washington and a former lawyer associated with several noted American jurists. He currently serves as the Chaplain of the John Carrol Society. In 2025, Archbishop Emeritus of The Archdiocese of Washington, Cardinal Wilton Gregory, accepted Monsignor Peter Vaghi's retirement. Prior to his retirement, he was the pastor of The Church of The Little Flower in Bethesda, Maryland, as well as previously pastor of St. Patrick's Church in Washington, D.C.

== Career ==
Vaghi was born in Washington, D.C., in 1948. After attending the College of the Holy Cross, he was awarded a Fulbright Scholarship to attend the University of Salzburg in Austria. After returning to America, he attended the University of Virginia School of Law and worked as an attorney and staffer to Senator Pete Domenici in Washington, D.C. Vaghi was then assigned as a seminarian to the Pontifical North American College, located in Rome, and attended the Pontifical Gregorian University in preparation for his ordination to the priesthood.

He was ordained in 1985, and designated a "Prelate of Honor" (entitling him to be addressed and referred to as "monsignor") by Pope John Paul II in 1995.

== Activities ==
Vaghi has drawn attention because of his association with a number of highly influential conservative American jurists. He participated in the baptism and conversion to Catholicism of both Robert Bork, the unsuccessful conservative Supreme Court nominee, and columnist Robert Novak. He is also said to have a close relationship with Supreme Court Associate Justice Clarence Thomas, his college classmate, with Associate Justice Antonin Scalia and U.S. Chief Justice John Roberts, whose family belongs to his parish.

Vaghi is also active in the John Carroll Society, "an old-time Catholic service organization favored by Washington's large Catholic legal and political establishment," as whose chaplain he served as of 1987.

== Books ==
- The Faith We Profess: A Catholic Guide to the Apostles' Creed by Peter Vaghi (2008)
- The Sacraments We Celebrate: A Catholic Guide to the Seven Mysteries of Faith (2010)
- The Commandments We Keep: A Catholic Guide to Living a Moral Life (2011)
- The Prayer We Offer: A Catholic Guide to Communion with God (2012)
- Encountering Jesus in Word, Sacraments, and Works of Charity (2013)
- Meeting God in the Upper Room: Three Moments to Change Your Life (2017)

== Sources ==
- Introduction of Vaghi to the U.S. House of Representatives (from where some biographical text was adapted)
- Newsweek article on Judge Roberts' nomination prospects, August 2005
- " Is Judge Roberts Opus Dei?" by Mark Crispin Miller, 2005
- John Carroll Society Leadership Register 2005-2007
