= Ian Holliday =

Vice-President and Pro-Vice-Chancellor (Teaching and Learning) of the University of Hong Kong
- Incumbent
- Assumed office 1 January 2015

Dean of Social Sciences, the University of Hong Kong
- In office 2006–2011

Personal details
- Born: 1960 (age 65–66)
- Education: Gonville and Caius College, Cambridge (MA); New College, Oxford (MPhil, DPhil)
- Occupation: Educator

Ian Holliday
- Chinese: 何立仁
- Traditional Chinese: 何立仁
Transcriptions
Standard Mandarin
- Hanyu Pinyin: Hé Lìrén
Yue: Cantonese
- Yale Romanization: hòh laahp yàhn
- Jyutping: Ho4 Lap6jan4

Ian Holliday (Chinese: 何立仁; Cantonese Yale: hòh laahp yàhn; Jyutping: Ho4 Lap6 jan4; pinyin: Hé Lìrén; born 1960) is a scholar with expertise in British and Asian Government, particularly in relation to Myanmar. He is currently the Vice-President and Pro-Vice-Chancellor (Teaching and Learning) of the University of Hong Kong. He graduated with a Bachelor of Arts degree (BA) in Social and Political Science at Gonville and Caius College, Cambridge in 1982, before completing his Doctor of Philosophy (DPhil) degree in Politics at New College, Oxford in 1989. He taught at University of Kent, University of Manchester (1990–99), New York University, and City University of Hong Kong (from 1999) before teaching at the University of Hong Kong (from 2006). He served as Dean of Faculty of Social Sciences of the University of Hong Kong for six years. He was appointed Vice-President of the University of Hong Kong in 2015.

== Myanmar ==
=== Art ===
Holliday has been an advocate for assisting Burmese artists who have been repressed by the military government in Myanmar, in 2014 co-curating an art show for banned artists, as well as writing the book Painting Myanmar's Transition in 2021.

=== Books ===
Holliday is co-editor of the book Routledge Handbook of Contemporary Myanmar and of Painting Myanmar's Transition. He is author of Burma Redux: Global Justice and the Quest for Political Reform in Myanmar, and coauthor of Liberalism and Democracy in Myanmar. He is widely cited as an expert on Myanmar (Burma).
