= Monbukagakushō Scholarship =

Academic scholarship

The Monbukagakushō Scholarship (文部科学省奨学金, Monbukagakushō Shōgakukin), formerly known as Monbushō Scholarship that supports foreign students, is an academic scholarship offered by the Japanese Ministry of Education, Culture, Sports, Science and Technology (Monbu-kagaku-shō, or MEXT), and is selected on the recommendation of the Japanese Embassy/Consulate General, University, or Authority. Over 65,000 students from approximately 160 countries and regions around the world have studied in Japan under this Scholarship program which was established in 1954.

== Scholarship types ==
There are seven types of Japanese government-sponsored scholarships available under the Japanese Government Scholarship program: those for research students, teacher training students, undergraduate university students, Japanese studies students, college of technology students, special training students and YLP students.

== Recommendations ==
Every year a large number of students are enrolled by embassy recommendation. Each half of the contingent undergoes a one-year preparatory program at either Osaka University or Tokyo University of Foreign Studies before entering a 4-year undergraduate program at one of 87 Japanese national universities.
