= EducationUSA =

- Type: GO, part of the U.S. Department of State
- Purpose: U.S higher education
- Location: Washington, D.C.
- Region served: Worldwide
- Website: educationusa.state.gov

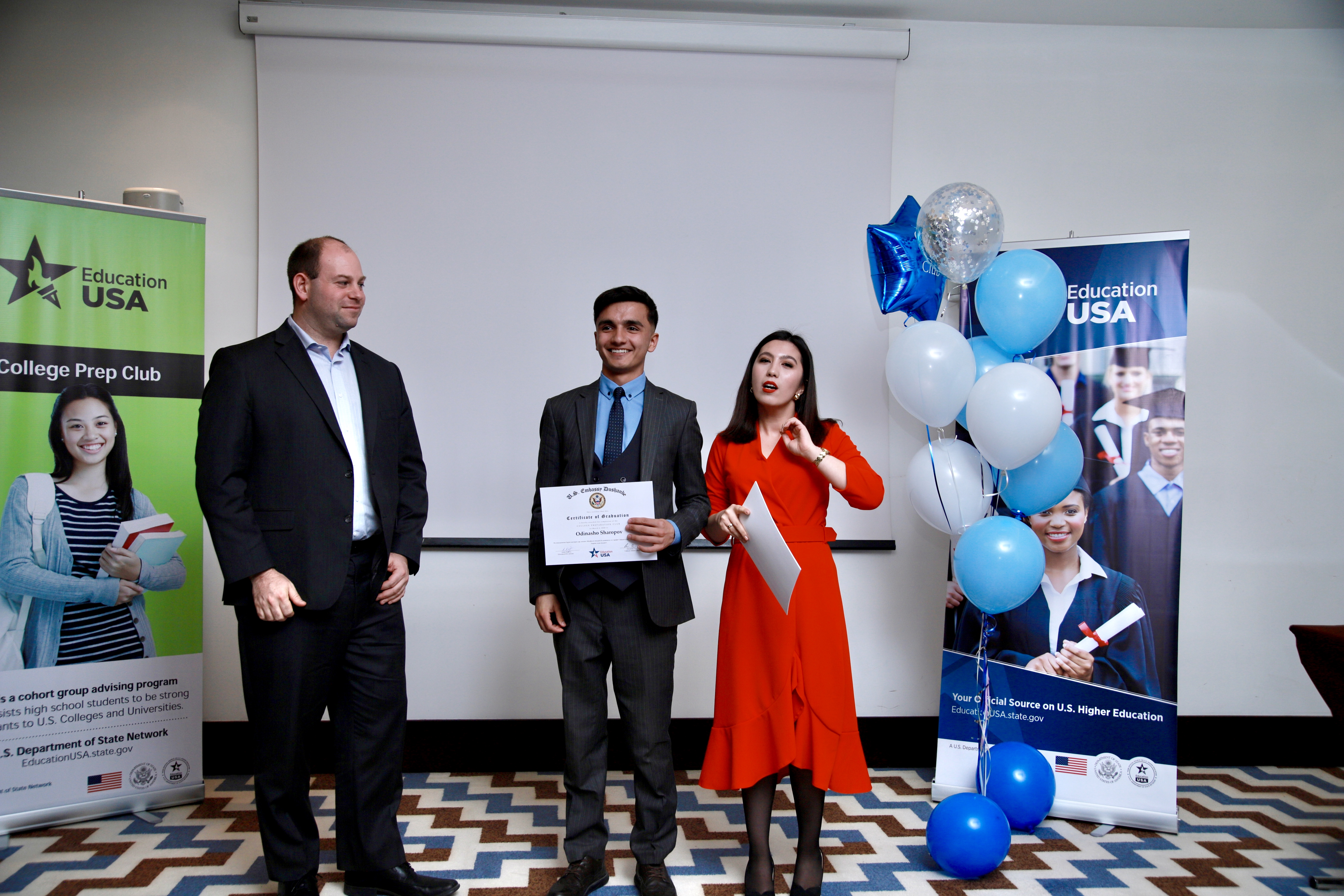
EducationUSA Tajikistan awarding a certificate to Odinasho Sharopov

EducationUSA is a US Department of State network of international student advising centers in more than 170 countries. Officially a branch of the Office of Global Educational Programs, a part of the Bureau of Educational and Cultural Affairs (ECA), the ECA fosters mutual understanding between the United States and other countries by promoting personal, professional, and institutional ties between private citizens and organizations in the United States and abroad, as well as by presenting U.S. history, society, art and culture to overseas audiences.

== Services ==
Advisers offer a wide range of in-person and virtual services to students and their families based on Your 5 Steps to U.S. Study, a guide to navigating the U.S. higher education application process. Advisers provide information on a host of topics, including:

- The admissions process and standardized testing requirements
- How to finance a U.S. education
- The student visa process
- Preparing for departure to the United States

== Programs ==
Opportunity Funds Program The EducationUSA Opportunity Funds program assists highly qualified students who are likely to be awarded full financial aid from U.S. colleges and universities, but lack the financial resources to cover the up-front costs to apply, such as testing, application fees, or airfare.

Each Opportunity Funds student undergoes a selective process of evaluation by an EducationUSA adviser, Regional Educational Advising Coordinator (REAC), and the Public Affairs Section of a U.S. Embassy/Consulate. More than 100 colleges and universities have enrolled Opportunity Funds students since 2006.

== See also ==
- Study abroad
- AFS Intercultural Programs
- Student exchange program

- Goodwill Scholarships
