= Language proficiency =

Measurement of linguistic ability

Language proficiency is the ability of an individual to use language with a level of accuracy which transfers meaning in production and comprehension.

== Definition ==
There is no singular definition of language proficiency: while certain groups limit its scope to speaking ability, others extend it to cover both productive language and receptive language skills and their effective application in varying practical contexts. However, this diversity has implications for its application in other language domains such as literacy, testing, endangered languages, language impairment. There is little consistency as to how different organizations classify it. As of 2014, native-level fluency was estimated to require a lexicon between 20,000 and 40,000 words, but basic conversational fluency might require as few as 3,000 words.

== Development ==
Developing proficiency in any language begins with word learning. By the time they are 12 months old, children learn their first words and by the time they are 36 months old, they may know well over 900 words with their utterances intelligible to the people who interact with them the most.

Developing language proficiency improves an individual’s capacity to communicate. Over time through interaction and through exposure to new forms of language in use, an individual learns new words, sentence structures, and meanings, thereby increasing their command of using accurate forms of the target language.

== Issues in endangered languages ==
Endangered languages are undergoing efforts to revitalize them. Some of these languages have few to no speakers. The learners of these languages are engaged in using documented resources (i.e. word lists, hymnals, bibles) to relearn their languages. Language proficiency in these cases of endangerment is being determined by how much language is learned in these communities through these efforts; proficient speakers are being determined by these communities themselves.

== Frameworks ==
Note that test scores may not correlate reliably, as different understandings of proficiency lead to different types of assessment:

- FSI Test (Foreign Service Institute) Scores range from 0 to 5. (deprecated)
- Interagency Language Roundtable Scores range from 0 to 5. (evolved from FSI)
- Language Proficiency Index
- ACTFL Proficiency Guidelines ACTFL recognises ten different levels of proficiency: "novice", "intermediate", "advanced", and "superior", of which the first three are each subdivided into "low", "mid", and "high".
- Common European Framework of Reference for Languages CEFR recognises six levels: A1, A2, B1, B2, C1 and C2.

== Tests ==
- Cambridge English Language Assessment tests
- CaMLA (Cambridge Michigan Language Assessments)
- CELI (Certificato di Conoscenza della Lingua Italiana)
- CELPE-Bras (Certificate of Proficiency in Portuguese for Foreigners)
- CILS (Certificazione di Italiano come Lingua Straniera)
- DALF
- Defense Language Proficiency Tests
- DELF (Diplôme d'études en langue française)
- DELE (Diplomas of Spanish as Foreign Language)
- Examination for Japanese University Admission
- General English Proficiency Test
- GOETHE
- HSK (汉语水平考试 Hànyǔ Shuǐpíng Kǎoshì)
- IELTS (International English Language Testing System)
- iTEP (International Test of English Proficiency)
- JLPT (日本語能力試験 Japanese-Language Proficiency Test)
- Language Proficiency Assessment for Teachers
- Pearson Test of English Academic (PTE-A)
- Pipplet Fluency Exam CEFR oral and writing
- PLIDA (Progetto Lingua Italiana Dante Alighieri)
- Seal of Biliteracy
- The European Language Certificates (telc - language tests)
- TOEFL (Test of English as a Foreign Language)
- TOEIC (Test of English for International Communication)
- TOPIK (한국어능력시험 Test of Proficiency in Korean)
- TEPS (Test of English Proficiency developed by Seoul National University)
- Test of Russian as a Foreign Language
- Test de français international
- Test de connaissance du français
- TOCFL (華語文能力測驗 Test of Chinese as a Foreign Language)
- UBELT (University of Bath English Language Test)

== Organizations ==
The American Council on the Teaching of Foreign Languages (ACTFL) distinguishes between proficiency and performance. In part, ACTFL's definition of proficiency is derived from mandates issued by the U.S. government, declaring that a limited English proficient student is one who comes from a non-English background and "who has sufficient difficulty speaking, reading, writing, or understanding the English language and whose difficulties may deny such an individual the opportunity to learn successfully in classrooms where the language of instruction is English or to participate fully in our society".

ACTFL views "performance" as being the combined effect of all three modes of communication: interpretive, interpersonal, and presentational.

- Alliance Française
- AIL (Accademia Italiana di Lingua)
- American Council on the Teaching of Foreign Languages
- Association of Language Testers in Europe
- Confucius Institute
- Foreign Service Institute
- Goethe-Institut
- Instituto Cervantes
- Japan Foundation
- Società Dante Alighieri
- UCLES
- UNIcert
- UONEDU

== See also ==
- EF English Proficiency Index
- Fluency
- Vocabulary – The set of words in a given language that a speaker is familiar with, which can be subdivided into: a) words which are recognized upon hearing or reading; and b) words which a person feels comfortable using in speech.
- List of language proficiency tests
