= Nihongo Kentei =

Japanese language proficiency test

- Acronym: Goken
- Type: Language Proficiency Test
- Year started: 2007
- Languages: Japanese
- Website: https://www.nihongokentei.jp

The Nihongo Kentei (日本語検定, The Japanese Language Examination) is a standardized test of Japanese language proficiency for native Japanese language speakers. The test is held twice a year, in June and November; approximately 300,000 people sit the examination every year.

In 2011, the test was sponsored by the Japanese Ministry of Education, Culture, Sports, Science, and Technology (MEXT).

== Overview ==
The Nihongo Kentei was created to assess overall ability in the Japanese language. The questions focus on more obscure and difficult areas of the Japanese language, such as proficiency in Kanji, the use of honorifics, and extended vocabulary. Although intended for native speakers, the exam is open to all applicants.

It is not to be confused with the Japanese Language Proficiency Test (JLPT), which is intended for non-native Japanese speakers.

== Features ==
Questions in the Nihongo Kentei fall into six categories.

1. 敬語 (Honorifics)
2. 文法 (Grammar)
3. 語彙 (Vocabulary)
4. 言葉の意味 (Definitions)
5. 表記 (Expressions)
6. 漢字 (Kanji)

The test consists of practical Japanese questions, designed to evaluate the candidate's understanding of Japanese. These highlight areas of strength and weaknesses.

== Criteria for certification ==
There are two types of certifications for each level, depending on the percentage scored.

Successful applicants must score more than 50% for all the six categories mentioned above (shown in the table below as "category threshold"). If results in any category fall below the category threshold, the candidate will not be certified (except for the lowest category, Level 7). Note that 1級 (Level 1) refers to the best possible grade, and 7級(Level 7) refers to the worst.

級 (Level)	Test time	Threshold Percentage	Category threshold	Certification
1級 (Level 1)	60min	80% or more	50% or more	1級 (Level 1)
1級 (Level 1)	60min	70-80%	50% or more	準1級 (Semi Level 1)
2級 (Level 2)	60min	75% or more	50% or more	2級 (Level 2)
2級 (Level 2)	60min	65-75%	50% or more	準2級 (Semi Level 2)
3級 (Level 3)	60min	70% or more	50% or more	3級 (Level 3)
3級 (Level 3)	60min	60-70%	50% or more	準3級 (Semi Level 3)
4級 (Level 4)	50min	70% or more	50% or more	4級 (Level 4)
4級 (Level 4)	50min	60-70%	50% or more	準4級 (Semi Level 4)
5級 (Level 5)	50min	70% or more	50% or more	5級 (Level 5)
5級 (Level 5)	50min	60-70%	50% or more	準5級 (Semi Level 5)
6級 (Level 6)	50min	70% or more	50% or more	6級 (Level 6)
6級 (Level 6)	50min	60-70%	50% or more	準6級 (Semi Level 6)
7級 (Level 7)	50min	70% or more		7級 (Level 7)
7級 (Level 7)	50min	60-70%		準7級 (Semi Level 7)

== Applications statistics and results ==
Year	Level	Goken in Japan		
Year	Level	Applicants	Certified (%)	Semi Level Certified (%)
2017-1	1級(Level 1)	682	9.2%	18.4%
2017-1	2級(Level 2)	3,257	16.2%	25.1%
2017-1	3級(Level 3)	17,741	33.7%	35.3%
2017-1	4級(Level 4)	7,189	68.1%	19.6%
2017-1	5級(Level 5)	3,262	76.5%	14.7%
2017-1	6級(Level 6)	3,074	63.4%	18.2%
2017-1	7級(Level 7)	927	91.2%	3.3%
2017-2	1級(Level 1)	727	19.1%	24.5%
2017-2	2級(Level 2)	3,897	8.8%	9.9%
2017-2	3級(Level 3)	15,542	38.0%	28.3%
2017-2	4級(Level 4)	8,816	73.9%	16.9%
2017-2	5級(Level 5)	6,017	79.9%	13.2%
2017-2	6級(Level 6)	4,152	71.1%	13.9%
2017-2	7級(Level 7)	1,357	86.7%	3.4%
2018-1	1級(Level 1)	594	4.9%	21.9%
2018-1	2級(Level 2)	2,881	11.0%	35.8%
2018-1	3級(Level 3)	18,787	44.2%	20.4%
2018-1	4級(Level 4)	7,017	83.6%	7.1%
2018-1	5級(Level 5)	2,082	78.9%	6.4%
2018-1	6級(Level 6)	1,278	78.0%	2.8%
2018-1	7級(Level 7)	3,436	89.6%	3.3%
2018-2	1級(Level 1)	682	9.2%	18.4%
2018-2	2級(Level 2)	3,257	16.2%	25.1%
2018-2	3級(Level 3)	17,741	33.7%	35.3%
2018-2	4級(Level 4)	7,189	68.1%	19.6%
2018-2	5級(Level 5)	3,262	76.5%	14.7%
2018-2	6級(Level 6)	3,074	63.4%	18.2%
2018-2	7級(Level 7)	927	91.2%	3.3%
2019-1	1級(Level 1)	596	14.1%	33.7%
2019-1	2級(Level 2)	2,841	9.3%	23.9%
2019-1	3級(Level 3)	19,519	41.9%	22.9%
2019-1	4級(Level 4)	7,735	76.2%	10.6%
2019-1	5級(Level 5)	3,264	78.9%	9.1%
2019-1	6級(Level 6)	2,335	74.5%	2.8%
2019-1	7級(Level 7)	2,158	91.4%	2.4%
2019-2	1級(Level 1)	618	7.2%	26.3%
2019-2	2級(Level 2)	3,599	7,9%	23.4%
2019-2	3級(Level 3)	14,079	40.7.%	25.3%
2019-2	4級(Level 4)	8,704	72.9%	14.3%
2019-2	5級(Level 5)	4,501	76.2%	8.8%
2019-2	6級(Level 6)	2,904	77.0%	6.6%
2019-2	7級(Level 7)	1,531	86.1%	7.5%

== See also ==
- Japanese-Language Proficiency Test
- Business Japanese Proficiency Test
- Mandarin Proficiency Test (HSK)
- ILR scale
- J-Test
- Kanji Kentei
- Test of Proficiency in Korean
- List of language proficiency tests
