= Italian Language Examinations =

Examinations for the Italian language for foreigners

Italian Language Examinations features the examinations for the Italian language for foreigners. They provide applicants with the ability to officially recognize competency in speaking Italian at various levels. Examinations include:

- CELI
- CILS (Qualification)
- CIC
- PLIDA
- AIL
