= Test of Proficiency in Korean =

Korean-language test for nonnative speakers in South Korea

- Acronym: TOPIK
- Type: Internet-based or paper-based standardized test.
- Administrator: National Institute for International Education
- Skills tested: Reading, listening, speaking and writing of the Korean language.
- Year started: 1997; 29 years ago
- Languages: Korean
- Website: topik.go.kr

The Test of Proficiency in Korean (TOPIK; Korean: 한국어능력시험; Hanja: 韓國語能力試驗) is a test to measure the Korean language proficiency of non-native speakers in South Korea. This examination system was introduced by the South Korean government in 1997 and conducted by a branch of the Ministry of Education of the country.

The test is offered six times annually (Jan, Apr, May, Jul, Oct, Nov) within South Korea and less often to people studying Korean in other countries. The test is for individuals whose first language is not Korean and is taken by overseas ethnic Koreans, those wishing to study at a Korean university, and for those who want to be employed at Korean companies in and outside of Korea. Since 2011, TOPIK is administered by the National Institute for International Education (국립국제교육원, NIIED), a branch of the Ministry of Education in South Korea.

== History ==
The test was first administered in 1997 and taken by 2,274 people. Initially the test was held only once a year. In 2009, 180,000 people took the test. The Korean government introduced a law in 2007 that required Chinese workers of Korean descent with no relatives in Korea to attain more than 200 points (out of 400) in the Business TOPIK (B-TOPIK) so they could be entered into a lottery for work visa.

From 1997 to 1998, TOPIK was administered by Korea Research Foundation (KRF). From 1999 to 2010, TOPIK was administered by the Korea Institute for Curriculum and Evaluation (KICE).

In 2012, more than 150,000 candidates took the TOPIK, and the total number of people who have taken the test since its date of inception surpassed 1 million.

Year	Number of candidates
1997	2,692
2006	34,028
2012	151,166
2016	250,141
2017	290,638
2018	329,224
2019	375,871
2020	218,869

== Format ==
=== Old format ===
In previous years, the test was divided into four parts: vocabulary and grammar, writing, listening, and reading. Two versions of the test were offered: the Standard (S)-TOPIK and the Business (B)-TOPIK. There were three different levels of S-TOPIK: beginner (초급), intermediate (중급), and advanced (고급). Depending on the average score and minimum marks in each section it was possible to obtain grades 1-2 in beginner, 3-4 in intermediate and 5-6 in advanced S-TOPIK. In B-TOPIK the scores in each section (out of 100) were added together to give a score out of 400.

=== New format ===
A new format of the TOPIK took effect from the 35th TOPIK test, held on 20 July 2014. Instead of the original ternary (Beginner, Intermediate and Advanced) classification, there are now only two test levels – TOPIK I and TOPIK II. TOPIK I has sub-levels 1 and 2, whereas TOPIK II has four sub-levels from 3 to 6. Another important change is that now the TOPIK I has only two sections – Reading and Listening, instead of four sections in the old format. TOPIK II has three sections – Reading, Listening and Writing.

== Validity ==
The test results are valid for two years after the announcement of examination results.

== Grading ==
TOPIK I is the basic level test containing two obtainable grades, while TOPIK II is the combined intermediate/advanced level with four obtainable grades. The evaluation is based on the total number of points earned.

Examination Level	Level	Pass Mark	Evaluation Criteria
TOPIK I	Level 1	Over 80 points	Able to carry out basic conversations related to daily survival skills such as self-introduction, purchasing, ordering food, etc., and to understand the contents related to personal and familiar subjects such as himself/herself, family, hobby, weather and the like. Able to create simple sentences based on about 800 basic vocabulary items and possess understanding of basic grammar. Able to understand and compose simple and useful sentences related to everyday life.
TOPIK I	Level 2	Over 140 points	Able to carry out simple conversations related to daily routines such as making phone calls and asking for favours, as well as using public facilities in daily life. (Able to use about 1,500 to 2,000 vocabulary and understand personal and familiar subjects in certain order, such as paragraphing.) Able to use formal expressions and informal expressions accordingly depending on the situation.
TOPIK II	Level 3	Over 120 points	Able to perform basic linguistic functions necessary to use various public facilities and maintain social relationship, not experiencing significant difficulty in routine life. Able to carry out daily routine, with fair use of public facilities and able to socialize without significant difficulty. Able to express or understand social subjects familiar to himself/herself, as well as specific subjects, based on the paragraph's subject matter. Able to understand and use written language and spoken language based on their distinctive basic characteristics.
TOPIK II	Level 4	Over 150 points	Able to perform linguistic functions necessary to use various public facilities and maintain social relationship, and carry out these functions to some degree which is necessary for the performance of ordinary tasks. Able to use various public facilities, socialize, and carry out some degree of ordinary work. Able to understand easy parts in news broadcasts, newspapers, and understand and use expressions related to social and abstract subjects relatively correctly and fluently. Able to understand social and cultural subjects, based on understanding of Korean culture and frequently used idiomatic expressions.
TOPIK II	Level 5	Over 190 points	Able to perform linguistic functions to some degree that are necessary for research and tasks in professional fields. Able to understand and use expressions related to even unfamiliar aspects of politics, economics, society, and culture. Able to use expressions properly, depending on formal, informal, spoken/written context.
TOPIK II	Level 6	Over 230 points	Able to perform linguistic functions necessary for research and tasks in professional fields relatively correctly and fluently. Able to understand and use the expressions related to even unfamiliar subjects of politics, economics, society, and culture. Experiences no difficulty in performing functions or conveying meaning, although the proficiency level is not quite at the same level as a university-educated native speaker.

== Structure of questions ==
The test consists of mostly multiple-choice questions; however, the TOPIK II level writing examination will require a short-answer. TOPIK I consists of multiple-choice questions for listening (40 minutes long with 30 questions) and reading (60 minutes long with 40 questions). Both examination areas are worth a score of 100 with a combining score of 200. TOPIK II has two slots. The first slot is the listening examination (60 minutes long with 50 questions) and writing (50 minutes long with 4 short-answer questions). The second slot is for the reading examination (70 minutes long with 50 questions). All three examinations of TOPIK II are worth a score of 100 with a combining score of 300.

== Use of the test result ==
- Korean university admission for foreigners.
- Obtaining work visas for local Korean companies.
- Recognizing domestic practitioner license for foreigners with medical doctor qualifications.
- For the application of a Korean Language Teaching Qualification test (level 2 and 3) and acquisition of certificate.
- To apply for permanent residency.
- To obtain marriage based immigrant visa.

== Testing locations ==
As of February 2021, there are 314 testing centers, with 54 in South Korea and the remaining are in 87 countries. In addition to Korea, TOPIK is available in the following countries and districts: Argentina, Armenia, Australia, Azerbaijan, Bangladesh, Belarus, Brazil, Bulgaria, Cambodia, Canada, Chile, China, Colombia, Cuba, Czech Republic, Egypt, France, Germany, Hungary, India, Indonesia, Iran, Italy, Japan, Jordan, Kazakhstan, Kenya, Kyrgyzstan, Lebanon, Madagascar, Malaysia, Mexico, Moldova, Mongolia, Morocco, Myanmar, Nepal, Netherlands, New Zealand, Pakistan, Paraguay, Philippines, Portugal, Poland, Russia, Romania, Rwanda, Singapore, Spain, Sri Lanka, Taiwan, Tajikistan, Turkey, UAE, Ukraine, USA, United Kingdom, Uzbekistan, and Vietnam. Examination times are divided into three time zones: China and marginal states (China, Hong Kong, Mongolia, Philippines, Taiwan, Singapore and Brunei; which shares the same time zone of UTC+8), Korea and Japan (which shares the same time zone of UTC+9), and other countries (which follows local time of a specific country). In India, TOPIK test is conducted in 5 cities - New Delhi, Chennai, Hyderabad, Ranchi, and Manipur.

== See also ==
- Korean Language Proficiency Test
- Business Japanese Proficiency Test
- Test of Chinese as a Foreign Language
- Hànyǔ Shuǐpíng Kǎoshì
- ILR scale
- J-Test
- Kanji kentei
- List of language proficiency tests
