= EJU =

EJU may refer to:

- easyJet Europe
- European Jewish Union
- European Judo Union
- Examination for Japanese University Admission
