= Vernacular orientation =

Attitude to one's mother tongue

Vernacular orientation refers to the status that a language is afforded by one of its mother-tongue speakers (Tiessen, 2003). This status is exhibited through the sociolinguistic behaviours of a mother-tongue speaker. A speaker who exhibits positive vernacular orientation is one who exhibits a preferred status for their mother tongue in such things as patterns of language use, language attitudes, social networks and even levels of language proficiency. Likewise, a speaker who exhibits negative vernacular orientation is one who exhibits a preferred status for a language other than their mother tongue in these areas of sociolinguistic behaviour.

An example of research into vernacular orientation as expressed in a community can be found in a 2003 master of arts thesis. This is a study on vernacular orientation in the Talysh community of the city of Sumgayit in the Republic of Azerbaijan for the purpose of gaining a greater understanding of its causes. Vernacular orientation is described in three areas of sociolinguistic behaviour: patterns of vernacular language use, vernacular language proficiency and frequency of vernacular-speaking individuals in social networks. Data was collected through personal interviews. The questionnaires for these interviews were developed using a qualitative-relational research approach. The description of vernacular orientation takes the form of a criteria-based typology of which an analysis of influential factors is ultimately made. This analysis of influential factors demonstrates the interaction between vernacular orientation as described in the typology and the contextual elements of the family, socio-economic dynamics and individual attitudes.
