= Korean Language Ability Test =

Language proficiency test

- Hangul: 세계한국말인증시험
- Hanja: 世界韓國말認證試驗
- RR: Segye Hangungmal injeung siheom
- MR: Segye Han'gungmal injŭng sihŏm

The Korean Language Ability Test (KLAT; Korean: 세계한국말인증시험; formerly Korean Language Proficiency Test, or KLPT) is a proficiency test for non-native speakers of Korean language. It is offered by the Korean Language Society and is a major alternative to Test of Proficiency in Korean (or TOPIK), offered by the Korea Institute for Curriculum and Evaluation (KICE).

The standard KLAT test assesses the abilities of the test-taker for daily life and work, for professional and educational settings in Korea. There is also a Basic-KLAT, or B-KLAT, that "assesses whether or not examinees have basic communication ability."

As of February 2021, there are 36 testing venues in 11 countries. Most testing centers are located in South Korea, China, Southeast, and Central Asia.

== See also ==
- Test of Proficiency in Korean
