= Language Proficiency Assessment for Teachers =

The Language Proficiency Assessment for Teachers (LPAT; Chinese: 教師語文能力評核) is an assessment examination for the language proficiency of teachers in Hong Kong. According to regulations, any teachers teaching English language or Putonghua (a.k.a. Mandarin Chinese) in Hong Kong, where Cantonese Chinese is mostly spoken, must have passed the LPAT, i.e. achieved a grade of not lower than Level 3 in each part of the assessment.

== Introduction ==
The LPAT examination is jointly held by the Hong Kong Examinations and Assessment Authority (HKEAA) and the Education Bureau (EDB) of the Hong Kong Government. There are two assessment examinations held annually in March and September, candidates are required to apply for the examination in beginning of October (?-no later than one month-?) before the examination commence and application is open to public. However, after 2006, the examination will be held once only in March. Since the Academic Year of 2004, all new language teachers are required to have the minimum requirement of LPAT met before they can start teaching full-time.

HKEAA administer the oral and written portion of the examination, while the classroom language assessment is administered by the EDB.

== English Language ==
The English language examination consists of five papers:

1. Reading (Comprehension),
2. Writing,
3. Listening,
4. Speaking, and
5. Classroom Language Assessment.

== Putonghua ==
The Putonghua examination consists of four papers:

1. Listening and Recognition,
2. Pinyin,
3. Oral, and
4. Classroom Language Assessment.

== See also ==
- California Subject Examinations for Teachers
