= General English Proficiency Test =

Taiwanese educational qualification

- Traditional Chinese: 全民英語能力分級檢定測驗
- Simplified Chinese: 全民英语能力分级检定测验
Transcriptions
Standard Mandarin
- Hanyu Pinyin: Quánmín Yīngyǔ Nénglì Fēnjí Jiǎndìng Cèyàn

GEPT
- Traditional Chinese: 全民英檢
- Simplified Chinese: 全民英验
Transcriptions
Standard Mandarin
- Hanyu Pinyin: Quánmín Yīngjiǎn

The General English Proficiency Test (GEPT; Chinese: 全民英語能力分級檢定測驗; pinyin: Quánmín Yīngyǔ Nénglì Fēnjí Jiǎndìng Cèyàn, or 全民英檢; Quánmín Yīngjiǎn for short) is a test of English language proficiency that was commissioned by Taiwan's Ministry of Education in 1999. The GEPT was developed by the Language Training and Testing Center in Taipei, Taiwan and was first administered in 2002.

== Overview ==
There are four levels of the test currently being administered: elementary, intermediate, high-intermediate, and advanced. A fifth level, the superior level, was administered only once and then suspended, pending further need. With the exception of the advanced level of the test, which is only conducted in Taipei at the LTTC headquarters, the GEPT is administered at sites located around the island of Taiwan as well as on offshore islands including Penghu and Kinmen.

The GEPT Elementary level is presumed to be appropriate for students who have studied English through junior high school. The GEPT Intermediate level is seen as suitable for high school graduates or university freshmen. The GEPT High-intermediate level is thought to be suitable for university graduates majoring in English. The GEPT Advanced level test is considered adequately difficult that only someone with a graduate degree from a university in an English-speaking country would be able to pass it.

Reportedly, comparability studies that will relate the GEPT to the Common European Framework standards of language proficiency are underway.

Each level is administered in a two-stage process. First, all examinees at each level take a listening and reading comprehension test. Those examinees who pass this first stage are allowed to register for the second stage, the speaking and writing portions of the test.

== Total number of examinees and passing rates ==
The elementary level test was first administered in 2002 and has been held twice each year since then. The total number of examinees to take the first stage of the elementary test through early 2005 was over 500,000. The passing rate for the first stage of the test is currently approximately 40%. The passing rate for examinees taking the second stage is approximately 77%.

The intermediate level of the test has also been held twice yearly since 2002. The number of examinees taking stage one of the test totals over 300,000, with a passing rate of approximately 34% for the first stage and 33% for the second stage.

The high-intermediate level of the test, also held twice yearly, has had a total of approximately 60,000 through 2004, and passing rates of 32% and 30% respectively for stages one and two.

The advanced level of the test is held once yearly, and the total number of examinees who have taken it since 2002 is approximately 3,000. The passing rate for stage one is approximately 21% and 16% for stage two.

== See also ==
- Public English Test System - English test in China
