= Test de français international =

The Test de français international (TFI) was a language proficiency test for non-native speakers of French. It was administered by the Educational Testing Service (ETS) and discontinued on February 28, 2025.

== Format of TFI exam ==
- is standardized
- is multiple choice
- contains 180 questions divided into two sections: listening and reading
- is composed of six parts (specific instructions are in French)
- lasts approximately 2.5 hours (including time for administrative procedures)
- measures French proficiency on a single, continuous scale
