= Language Proficiency Index =

The Language Proficiency Index or LPI was a Canadian standardized test for English proficiency administered by Paragon Testing Enterprises, a subsidiary of the University of British Columbia. The results of the test were used primarily by postsecondary institutions and professional organizations within the Province of British Columbia, Alberta and in the territory of Yukon. The test was discontinued in July 2020.

The test was 2.5 hours in length and consisted of five parts. Parts I, II, and III were multiple choice. In Parts I and II, the testee must correctly identify various grammar-related mistakes. Part III tested reading comprehension. In Part IV, the testee must summarise various short works of literature. Part V was a 300-400 word argumentative essay.
