= CELI =

Certification level in the Italian language

The Certificato di Conoscenza della Lingua Italiana (Certificate of Knowledge of Italian Language), or CELI (/ˈtʃɛli/, Italian: [ˈtʃeːli]; pronounced "Cheh-lee" rather than "Seh-lee"), is an internationally recognised qualification of the Italian language destined for foreigners wanting to validate their relative Italian fluency, offered by the Università per Stranieri di Perugia. It is accepted as an official qualification notably by the Italian Ministry of Education and Research (MUR) and the Italian Ministry of Foreign Affairs. It is one of the qualifications used by foreigners to get entrance into any Italian university or higher education institution through the CLIQ (Certificazione Lingua Italiana di Qualità) quality system.

== Origins ==
First introduced in 1987, the CELI qualification is one of many Italian Language Examinations. The Università per Stranieri di Perugia is responsible for its creation, distribution, evaluation and awarding, aligning its levels with the Common European Framework of Reference for Languages (CEFR).

== Procedure ==
An applicant wishing to obtain the CELI qualification must register and pay to sit the examination. When an applicant has completed the exam, the Università per Stranieri di Perugia evaluates it according to European Union guidelines, and awards the official qualification to candidates who pass the examination. The exams are held multiple times annually around the world at accredited institutional testing centers.

== See also ==
- CILS (Qualification)
- PLIDA
