= Kanji Kentei =

Standardized kanji proficiency test in Japan

The Japan Kanji Aptitude Test (日本漢字能力検定, Nihon Kanji Nōryoku Kentei) evaluates one's knowledge of kanji. The test is more commonly known as the Kanji Kentei (漢字検定), or the shorter Kanken (漢検). The test is administered by the Japan Kanji Aptitude Testing Foundation (日本漢字能力検定協会, Nihon Kanji Nōryoku Kentei Kyōkai).

== Overview ==
There are 12 levels (levels 10 through 3, pre-2, 2, pre-1 and 1) with level 10 being the easiest and level 1 the most difficult. The test examines not only one's ability to read and write kanji, but also one's ability to understand their meanings, to use them correctly in sentences, and to identify their correct stroke order.

Native speakers pass levels 10 through 7 at better than an 80% rate, whereas level 1 is so difficult that fewer than two thousand people take it each time it is offered, and fewer than 20% of those pass.

For levels 10 through 8, the test is 40 minutes long; for levels 7 through 1, it is 60 minutes long. A minimal score of 70% is required to pass levels 7 through pre-2, and a score of 80% is required for levels 10 through 8, 2, pre-1, and 1.

Levels 10 through 4 are primarily taken by kindergarten to elementary school age (up to 12 years old) children. Levels 3 and above are typically taken by high-school students and adults.

Level 2 is as high as many Japanese, even those with higher education degrees, tend to go. Passing level 2 can be used as leverage when applying for jobs, etc. Passing levels pre-1 and 1 is especially rare even among native speakers.

== Test levels and skills ==
Level	Target	Number of Kanji tested	New Kanji for the level	Passing Criteria	Pass Rate (15 June 2025)	Time	Price (Paper-based)	Price (CBT and Online)
1	University / General	approx. 6,000 (JIS X 0208 Level 1 & 2)	3,366	160/200 (80%)	8.3%	60 minutes	6,700 JPY	Paper-based only
Pre-1	University / General	approx. 3,000 (JIS X 0208 Level 1)	848	160/200 (80%)	22.8%	60 minutes	6,200 JPY	Paper-based only
2	High School Graduate / University / General	2,136 (All of Jōyō Kanji)	196	160/200 (80%)	29%	60 minutes	5,200 JPY	4,800 JPY
Pre-2	High School	1,951	333	140/200 (70%)	36.8%	60 minutes	4,200 JPY	3,800 JPY
3	Junior High Graduate	1,623	285	140/200 (70%)	48.1%	60 minutes	4,200 JPY	3,800 JPY
4	Junior High School	1,339	316	140/200 (70%)	51%	60 minutes	4,200 JPY	3,800 JPY
5	Elementary School Grade 6 Graduate	1,026 (All of Kyōiku Kanji)	191	140/200 (70%)	72.2%	60 minutes	3,700 JPY	3,200 JPY
6	Elementary School Grade 5 Graduate	835	193	140/200 (70%)	77%	60 minutes	3,700 JPY	3,200 JPY
7	Elementary School Grade 4 Graduate	642	202	140/200 (70%)	87.1%	60 minutes	3,700 JPY	3,200 JPY
8	Elementary School Grade 3 Graduate	440	200	120/150 (80%)	83%	40 minutes	3,200 JPY	2,700 JPY (Online only; CBT not available)
9	Elementary School Grade 2 Graduate	240	160	120/150 (80%)	89.5%	40 minutes	3,200 JPY	2,700 JPY (Online only; CBT not available)
10	Elementary School Grade 1 Graduate	80	80	120/150 (80%)	94.8%	40 minutes	3,200 JPY	2,700 JPY (Online only; CBT not available)

=== Level 10 ===
- Pass rate for this level: 95.0% (in 2016-17)
- Tests the 80 kanji learned in the first grade of elementary school (age 7); see Level 10 kanji.

Specifically:

- Tests knowledge of proper readings of kanji in context
- Tests knowledge of proper readings of two-character compound words, given two choices
- Tests knowledge of proper character stroke order and stroke count
- Tests ability to correctly identify and write kanji, given character reading and context

=== Level 9 ===
- Pass rate for this level: 90.1% (in 2016-17)
- Tests the 240 kanji learned up to the second grade of elementary school (age 8); see Level 9 kanji.

Specifically:

- Tests knowledge of proper readings of kanji in context
- Tests knowledge of proper character stroke order and stroke count
- Tests ability to correctly identify and write kanji, given character reading and context
- Tests knowledge of proper endings of kanji strokes (for example, whether a hook is drawn or not, and in which direction)

=== Level 8 ===
- Pass rate for this level: 84.8% (in 2016-17)
- Tests the 440 kanji learned up to the third grade of elementary school (age 9), including writing ability and the ability to use in sentences.

Specifically:

- Tests knowledge of proper readings of kanji in context
- Tests knowledge of proper character stroke order and stroke count
- Tests ability to correctly identify and write kanji, given character reading and context. This includes knowledge of antonyms, the ability to differentiate between homonyms: different kanji with the same reading, and the ability to correctly write characters when given the character radical
- Tests knowledge of okurigana

=== Level 7 ===
- Pass rate for this level: 86.3% (in 2016-17)
- Tests the 642 kanji learned up to the fourth grade of elementary school (age 10), including writing ability and the ability to use in sentences.

Specifically:

- Tests knowledge of proper readings of kanji in context. This includes knowledge of different readings of the same kanji
- Tests knowledge of proper character stroke order and stroke count
- Tests ability to distinguish between on and kun readings of characters
- Tests ability to correctly identify and write kanji, given character reading and context. This includes knowledge of antonyms, the ability to differentiate between homonyms: different kanji with the same reading, and the ability to correctly write characters when given the character radical
- Tests knowledge of okurigana
- Tests knowledge of two-character compound words

=== Level 6 ===
- Pass rate for this level: 79.2% (in 2016-17)
- Tests the 835 kanji learned up to the fifth grade of elementary school (age 11), including writing ability and the ability to use in sentences.

Specifically:

- Tests knowledge of proper readings of kanji in context
- Tests knowledge of okurigana
- Tests knowledge of character radicals and radical names
- Tests knowledge of proper character stroke order and stroke count
- Tests knowledge of two-character compound words, including the various methods by which compound words have been formed
- Tests ability to correctly identify and write kanji, given character reading and context. This includes knowledge of three-character compound words, knowledge of two-character compound antonyms and synonyms, and the ability to differentiate between homonyms: different kanji with the same reading
- Tests ability to distinguish between on and kun readings of characters in compound words (with the compound reading provided)

=== Level 5 ===
- Pass rate for this level: 72.2% (in 2016-17)
- Tests the 1026 kanji learned up to the sixth grade of elementary school (age 12) (i.e., the kyōiku kanji), including writing ability and the ability to use in sentences.

Specifically:

- Tests knowledge of proper readings of kanji in context
- Tests knowledge of character radicals and radical names
- Tests knowledge of proper character stroke order and stroke count
- Tests knowledge of okurigana
- Tests ability to distinguish between on and kun readings of characters in compound words
- Tests knowledge of two-character compound words, including the various methods by which compound words have been formed, and the ability to identify compound words based on the word definition
- Tests ability to correctly identify and write kanji, given character reading and context. This includes knowledge of four-character compound words, knowledge of two-character compound antonyms and synonyms, and the ability to differentiate between homonyms: different kanji with the same reading

=== Level 4 ===
- Pass rate for this level: 50.1% (in 2016-17)
- Tests the kanji learned up to the sixth grade of elementary school, plus an additional 313 daily use kanji (常用漢字 jōyō kanji)
- Tests on readings and kun readings, and the ability to use kanji in sentences
- Requires the ability to read about 1300 characters, and write about 900
- Tests knowledge of synonyms and antonyms
- Tests ability to differentiate between homonyms
- Tests idiomatic phrases and four-kanji compound words
- Tests knowledge of radicals required to use a kanji dictionary

=== Level 3 ===
- Pass rate for this level: 46.8% (in 2016-17)
- Tests the kanji learned up to the sixth grade of elementary school, plus an additional 597 daily use kanji (a total of 1623 characters)
- Tests on readings and kun readings, and the ability to use kanji in sentences
- Requires the ability to read about 1600 characters
- Tests special or unusual kanji readings
- Tests ateji (当て字), phonetic readings of characters
- Tests knowledge of synonyms and antonyms
- Tests ability to differentiate between homonyms
- Tests idiomatic phrases and four-kanji compound words
- Tests knowledge of radicals required to use a kanji dictionary

=== Level Pre-2 ===
- Pass rate for this level: 31.8% (in 2016-17)
- Tests the kanji learned up to the sixth grade of elementary school, plus an additional 925 daily use kanji (a total of 1951 characters)
- Tests on readings and kun readings, and the ability to use kanji in sentences
- Tests special or unusual kanji readings
- Tests ateji
- Tests knowledge of synonyms and antonyms
- Tests ability to differentiate between homonyms
- Tests special compound words
- Tests complex radicals

=== Level 2 ===
- Pass rate for this level: 21.2% (in 2016-17)
- Requires the ability to read and write all of the 2136 daily use kanji (jōyō kanji)
- Tests on readings and kun readings, and the ability to use kanji in sentences
- Tests special or unusual kanji readings
- Tests ateji
- Tests knowledge of synonyms and antonyms
- Tests ability to differentiate between homonyms
- Tests special compound words
- Tests complex radicals and composition of kanji

=== Level Pre-1 ===
- Pass rate for this level: 19.1% (in 2016-17)
- Tests the ability to read and write all 2965 kanji in level 1 of JIS X 0208, with their on readings and kun readings (jōyō kanji and jinmeiyō kanji).
- Requires the ability to use the kanji in sentences and to choose the most appropriate kanji for a given context
- Tests special or unusual kanji readings
- Tests ateji
- Tests knowledge of synonyms and antonyms
- Tests ability to differentiate between homonyms
- Tests special compound words
- Tests complex radicals
- Tests kanji unique to the Japanese language (kokuji)
- Tests knowledge of abbreviated kanji forms (ryakuji) such as 餠→餅, 摑→掴
- Tests classical Japanese proverbs and idiomatic expressions

=== Level 1 ===
- Pass rate for this level: 10.4% (in 2016-17)
- Tests the ability to read and write all kanji that have their dedicated entries in the Kanken Kanji Jiten (6350), with their on readings and kun readings
- Requires the ability to use the kanji in sentences and to choose the most appropriate kanji for a given context
- Tests special or unusual kanji readings
- Tests ateji
- Tests knowledge of synonyms and antonyms
- Tests ability to differentiate between homonyms
- Tests special compound words
- Tests complex radicals
- Tests kanji unique to the Japanese language
- Tests classical Japanese proverbs and idiomatic expressions
- Tests place and country names
- Tests the ability to recognize the relationship between modern and ancient or old character forms

== Test modes ==
The exam is available in three modes: Paper-based, Computer-based test (Kanken CBT), and At home test (Kanken Online). CBT and Online are available only in Japan. The following table denotes key differences between each mode:

	Levels	Time
Paper-based	1-10	Three times per year in June, October and February
CBT	2-7	Varied, depending on test centers. Available year-round.
Kanken Online	2-10	Every Sunday

== Locations ==
The Japan Kanji Aptitude Test is open to anyone regardless of nationality, and there are even testing locations available outside Japan in countries including: Canada, the United States, France, Germany, Australia, Thailand and Korea. However, levels pre-1 and 1 can only be taken in Japan.

== Certification ==
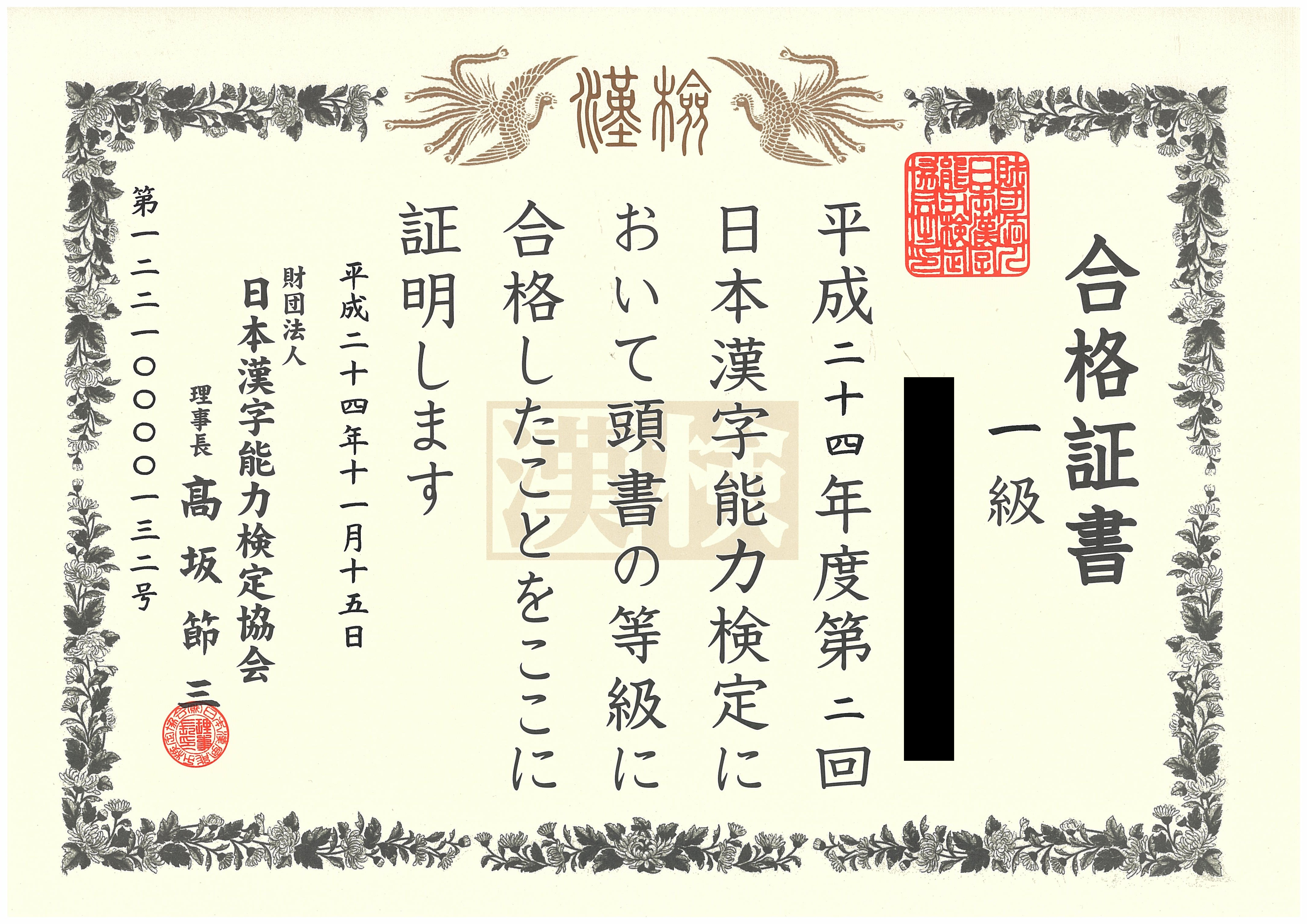
Certificate for the level 1 test

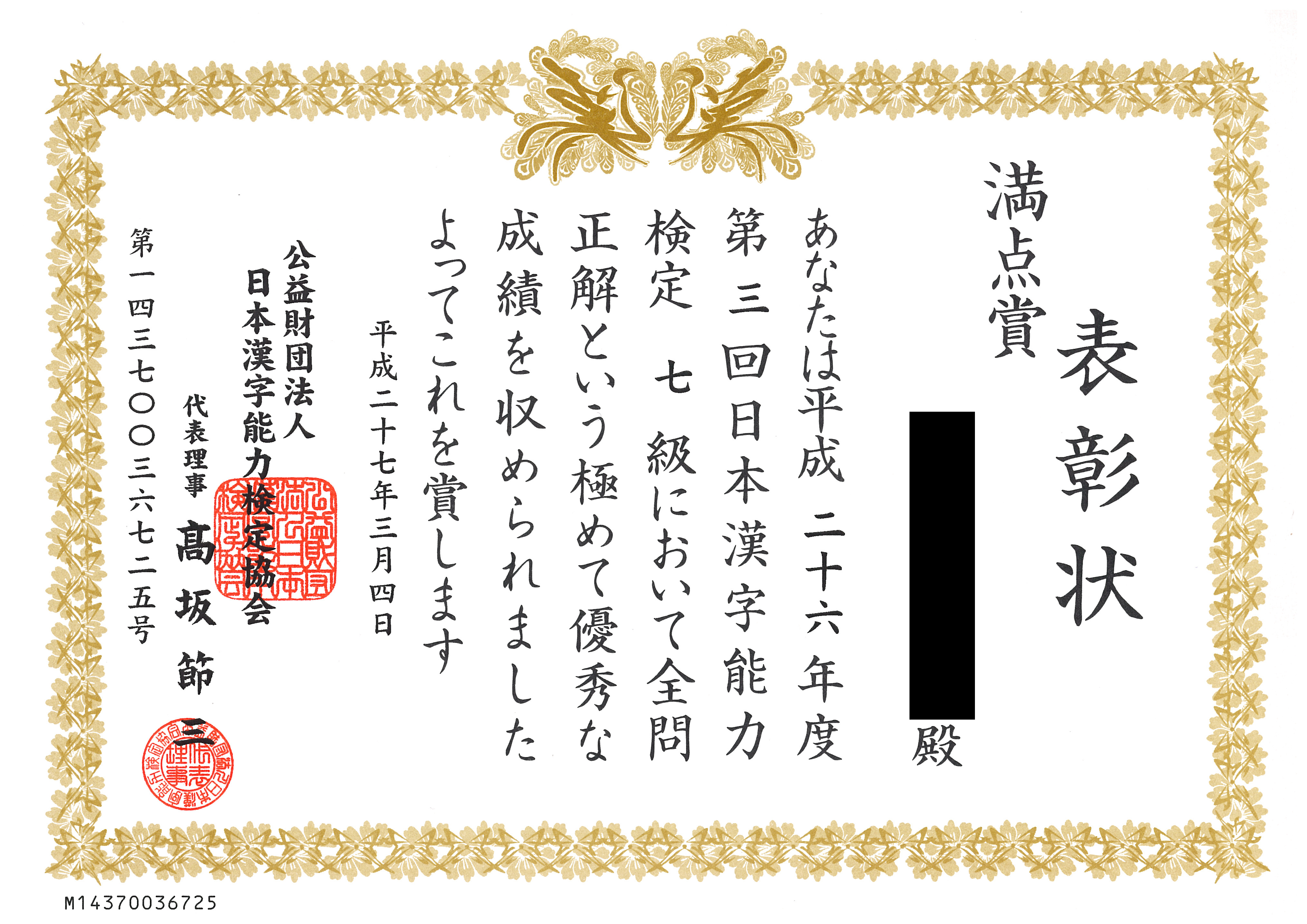
Certificate for achieving a perfect score on a given level

Certificates of passing are awarded for each level of the test, and contain such information as the test taker's name, level, year, as well as the sequential number of the test (a single digit designator for regular paper tests held 3 times a year, or two digits for computer-based tests (CBT) held with higher frequency at more than 150 testing sites across Japan).

A serial number for a paper based Kanji Kentei test consists of 11 digits, while the one for a CBT test - of 12, written in kanji characters: 2 digits for the year (taken from the last two digits of the current year according to the Gregorian calendar, i.e. 2022 -> 二二), 1 or 2 digits for the sequential number of the test, 2 digits for the level, 6 digits for the individual number).

Kanji Kentei results are accepted by some educational institutions giving applicants / students additional bonus points for admission / credits.

== See also ==
- Nihongo Kentei
- Business Japanese Proficiency Test, administered by the same organization
- Chinese character
- Japanese Language Proficiency Test
- Japanese language education
- Learning kanji
- J-Test
