= Japanese-Language Proficiency Test =

Standardized proficiency test

- Acronym: JLPT
- Type: Language proficiency test
- Administrator: Japan Foundation; Japan Educational Exchanges and Services
- Year started: 1984
- Languages: Japanese
- Website: www.jlpt.jp

The Japanese-Language Proficiency Test (日本語能力試験, Nihongo Nōryoku Shiken), or JLPT, is a standardized criterion-referenced test to evaluate and certify Japanese language proficiency for non-native speakers, covering language knowledge, reading ability, and listening ability. The test is held twice a year in Japan and selected countries (on the first Sunday of July and December), and once a year in other regions (either on the first Sunday of December or July depending on region). The JLPT is conducted by the Japan Foundation for tests overseas (with cooperation of local host institutions), and Japan Educational Exchanges and Services for tests in Japan.

The JLPT consists of five independent levels of certification, with 5 the lowest and 1 the highest. Until 2009, the test had four levels of certification. JLPT certificates do not expire or become invalid over time.

== History ==
The JLPT was first held in 1984 in response to the growing demand for standardized Japanese language certification. Initially, 7,000 people took the test. Until 2003, the JLPT was one of the requirements for foreigners entering Japanese universities. Since 2003, the Examination for Japanese University Admission for International Students (EJU) is used by most universities for this purpose; unlike the JLPT, which is solely a multiple-choice exam, the EJU contains sections which require the examinee to write in Japanese.

== Uses and equivalencies ==
Correspondence of the JLPT Total Score to the CEFR Level
JLPT	Total Score	CEFR	
no equivalent		Proficient	C2
N1	142–180	Proficient	C1
N1	100–141	Independent	B2
N2	112–180	Independent	B2
N2	90–111	Independent	B1
N3	104–180	Independent	B1
N3	95–103	Basic	A2
N4	90–180	Basic	A2
N5	80–180	Basic	A1

JLPT certification can be used for many official purposes in Japan. For example, JLPT N1 or N2 certification can help foreign nationals receive preferential immigration treatment in some circumstances. Similarly, those who have passed either N1 or N2 (regardless of citizenship) are exempt from the Japanese language section of the middle school equivalency examination, which is required to enter a Japanese high school if the applicant did not graduate from a Japanese middle school, and N1 certification is sometimes accepted as an alternative to the Examination for Japanese University Admission for foreign students who wish to study at Japanese universities.

JLPT certification can also be required as a component of licensing in Japan. N1 certification is a prerequisite for foreign medical professionals who wish to take examinations to be licensed in Japan, and for certain foreign nationals who wish to attend nursing school in Japan. Further, under Japan's Economic partnership agreement with Indonesia, the Philippines, and Vietnam, a JLPT certificate is required for Indonesian, Filipino, and Vietnamese nurse or caregiver candidates who visit Japan.

The Japan Foundation provides an official table of comparison between the JLPT and the "linguistic" and "reception" elements of the Common European Framework of Reference for Languages (CEFR) scale based on the total score required to pass the exam. Beginning in December 2025, JLPT score reports will include an official indication of corresponding CEFR levels.

== Administration ==
In Japan, the JLPT is administered by the Ministry of Education, Culture, Sports, Science and Technology through the Japan Educational Exchanges and Services (JEES). Overseas, the Japan Foundation co-proctors test administration with local cultural exchange and/or educational institutions, or with committees specially established for this purpose.

== Test format ==
The revised test pattern was implemented in 2010. The test consists of five levels, with N1 the highest level and N5 the lowest. According to the exam, N1 represents "the ability to understand Japanese used in a variety of circumstances", N2 represents "the ability to understand Japanese used in everyday situations, and in a variety of circumstances to a certain degree", N3 represents "the ability to understand Japanese used in everyday situations to a certain degree", N4 represents "the ability to understand basic Japanese", and N5 represents "the ability to understand some basic Japanese". No Test Content Specification is published as it is discouraged to study from kanji and vocabulary lists.

=== Scoring ===
Passing is based on scaled scores calculated using item-response theory so that equivalent performance on tests from different years and different levels of difficulty yields the same scaled score. Raw scores are not directly used to determine conditions for passing, nor are they reported, except in rough form in the "Reference Information" of the score report, which tells test takers whether their raw scores were 67% or above, between 34% and 66%, or below 34%. This reference information is given for vocabulary, grammar, and reading on the N4 and N5, and for vocabulary and grammar (but not reading) on the N1, N2, and N3.

Since 2010, passing the test requires both achieving an overall pass mark for the total points, and passing each section individually. The overall pass mark depends on the level, and varies between 100/180 (55.55%) for the N1 and 80/180 (44.44%) for the N5. Meanwhile, scores of at least 31.67% are required for each section in order to ensure that test takers cannot pass by doing very well on one section and very poorly on another.

Pass marks for individual sections
Level	Overall pass mark	Language Knowledge (Vocabulary/Grammar)	Reading	Listening
N1	100 points	19 points	19 points	19 points
N2	90 points	19 points	19 points	19 points
N3	95 points	19 points	19 points	19 points
Total possible	180 points	60 points	60 points	60 points
N4	90 points	38 points		19 points
N5	80 points	38 points		19 points
Total possible	180 points	120 points		60 points

=== Test sections ===
Level	Test section (test time)			Total duration
N1	Language Knowledge (Vocabulary/Grammar)・Reading (110 min)		Listening (55 min)	165 min
N2	Language Knowledge (Vocabulary/Grammar)・Reading (105 min)		Listening (50 min)	155 min
N3	Language Knowledge (Vocabulary) (30 min)	Language Knowledge (Grammar)・Reading (70 min)	Listening (40 min)	140 min
N4	Language Knowledge (Vocabulary) (25 min)	Language Knowledge (Grammar)・Reading (55 min)	Listening (35 min)	115 min
N5	Language Knowledge (Vocabulary) (20 min)	Language Knowledge (Grammar)・Reading (40 min)	Listening (30 min)	90 min

- Note: "Vocabulary" includes kanji and vocabulary (previous 文字・語彙)

=== Estimated study time ===
Self-reported study hour comparison data for students residing in Japan, published by the Japanese Language Education Center:

JLPT Study Hour Comparison Data 2010-2015
Level	Students with kanji knowledge (e.g. speakers of Chinese)	Other students (no prior kanji knowledge)
N1	1700–2600 hours	3000–4800 hours
N2	1150–1800 hours	1600–2800 hours
N3	700–1100 hours	950–1700 hours
N4	400–700 hours	575–1000 hours
N5	250–450 hours	325–600 hours

== Applications and results ==
The application period is usually around early March until late April for July's examination and around early August until late September for December's exam.

Results for the December test are announced the following February for examinees in Japan, and March for overseas candidates. Test results are sent to the examinees through the testing organization or center to which they applied. From 2012, with online registration, results are available online before they are mailed out (late August for the July test). All examinees receive a report indicating their scores by section. Those who pass also receive a Certificate of Proficiency.

As of 2004, when there were 302,198 total test takers, the JLPT was offered annually in 40 countries including Japan. Since 2009, two exams have been held each year in East Asia, and the yearly number of test takers had risen to 1,168,535 by 2019. As of 2021, the regions with the most test takers were Japan, Taiwan, China, South Korea, India, Vietnam, Brazil, Indonesia, Bangladesh, and Myanmar.

Year	Level	JLPT in Japan			JLPT overseas		
Year	Level	Applicants	Examinees	Certified (%)	Applicants	Examinees	Certified (%)
2007	1 kyū	47,761	42,923	14,338 (33.4%)	135,616	110,937	28,550 (25.7%)
2007	2 kyū	34,782	31,805	11,884 (37.4%)	186,226	152,198	40,975 (26.9%)
2007	3 kyū	16,808	15,710	8,664 (55.1%)	143,252	113,526	53,806 (47.4%)
2007	4 kyū	3,908	3,383	2,332 (68.9%)	64,127	53,476	27,767 (51.9%)
2008	1 kyū	52,992	46,953	18,454 (39.3%)	138,131	116,271	38,988 (33.5%)
2008	2 kyū	41,924	38,040	16,289 (42.8%)	187,482	157,142	58,124 (37.0%)
2008	3 kyū	22,016	20,351	13,304 (65.4%)	147,435	120,569	69,605 (57.7%)
2008	4 kyū	4,524	3,903	2,765 (70.8%)	65,877	55,828	31,227 (55.9%)
2009-1	1 kyū	29,274	26,578	11,738 (44.2%)	103,349	87,104	28,230 (32.4%)
2009-1	2 kyū	26,437	24,793	9,279 (37.4%)	130,753	110,266	27,543 (25.0%)
2009-2	1 kyū	46,648	41,998	12,293 (29.3%)	137,708	114,725	26,427 (23.0%)
2009-2	2 kyū	36,528	33,807	12,462 (36.9%)	176,628	147,328	41,488 (28.2%)
2009-2	3 kyū	17,703	16,675	9,360 (56.1%)	131,733	108,867	51,903 (47.7%)
2009-2	4 kyū	3,212	2,932	2,155 (73.5%)	61,995	53,041	29,529 (55.7%)
2010-1	N1	26,225	23,694	9,651 (40.7%)	73,863	62,938	19,402 (30.8%)
2010-1	N2	24,738	23,126	13,768 (59.5%)	87,889	74,874	32,530 (43.4%)
2010-1	N3	6,947	6,280	3,051 (48.6%)	42,227	32,100	12,574 (39.2%)
2010-2	N1	40,041	36,810	12,774 (34.7%)	100,689	87,763	25,781 (29.4%)
2010-2	N2	27,947	26,020	11,679 (44.9%)	106,402	91,996	30,460 (33.1%)
2010-2	N3	8,363	7,665	3,501 (44.9%)	56,236	45,906	18,883 (41.1%)
2010-2	N4	7,764	7,317	3,716 (50.8%)	48,613	41,484	19,235 (46.4%)
2010-2	N5	2,065	1,870	1,458 (78.0%)	43,676	38,128	22,846 (59.9%)
2011-1	N1	24,716	22,782	6,546 (28.7%)	89,744	76,991	20,519 (26.7%)
2011-1	N2	19,203	17,957	9,057 (50.4%)	92,015	79,716	30,216 (37.9%)
2011-1	N3	5,642	5,211	2,511 (48.2%)	36,841	29,507	13,230 (44.8%)
2011-1	N4	3,643	3,358	1,431 (42.6%)	19,010	15,453	5,802 (37.5%)
2011-1	N5	716	649	464 (71.5%)	12,346	10,510	6,108 (58.1%)
2011-2	N1	36,426	33,460	11,849 (35.4%)	100,873	88,450	26,715 (30.2%)
2011-2	N2	22,875	21,296	8,695 (40.8%)	94,538	82,944	28,679 (34.6%)
2011-2	N3	8,149	7,580	3,073 (40.5%)	49,917	41,655	16,576 (39.8%)
2011-2	N4	7,008	6,596	3,083 (46.7%)	38,888	33,402	14,722 (44.1%)
2011-2	N5	1,603	1,481	1,045 (70.6%)	33,245	29,159	16,986 (58.3%)
2012-1	N1	26,051	24,142	11,074 (45.9%)	78,904	69,082	23,789 (34.4%)
2012-1	N2	20,041	18,843	9,683 (51.4%)	78,553	69,418	29,191 (42.1%)
2012-1	N3	7,317	6,878	3,232 (47.0%)	38,650	31,942	14,391 (45.1%)
2012-1	N4	5,437	5,116	2,388 (46.7%)	22,431	18,590	8,489 (45.7%)
2012-1	N5	1,004	925	679 (73.4%)	16,361	13,911	8,129 (58.4%)
2012-2	N1	32,917	30,296	7,998 (26.4%)	86,004	75,250	17,411 (23.1%)
2012-2	N2	21,139	19,612	7,919 (40.4%)	79,513	69,790	25,617 (36.7%)
2012-2	N3	10,085	9,422	2,668 (28.3%)	47,301	39,763	12,722 (32.0%)
2012-2	N4	6,961	6,562	2,371 (36.1%)	36,799	31,620	11,783 (37.3%)
2012-2	N5	1,416	1,307	945 (72.3%)	34,178	29,700	16,225 (54.6%)
2013-1	N1	27,099	25,117	8,503 (33.9%)	74,674	65,225	20,139 (30.9%)
2013-1	N2	20,956	19,712	9,117 (46.3%)	73,729	64,885	29,725 (45.8%)
2013-1	N3	9,988	9,337	3,623 (38.8%)	39,870	32,895	13,063 (39.7%)
2013-1	N4	5,637	5,297	2,485 (46.9%)	23,746	19,941	9,823 (49.3%)
2013-1	N5	1,000	905	696 (76.9%)	18,720	16,016	9,957 (62.2%)
2013-2	N1	31,691	28,929	10,031 (34.7%)	81,794	71,490	25,524 (35.7%)
2013-2	N2	22,859	21,211	8,410 (39.6%)	73,935	64,989	28,148 (43.3%)
2013-2	N3	12,436	11,501	3,911 (34.0%)	48,875	41,129	17,901 (43.5%)
2013-2	N4	6,963	6,430	2,871 (44.7%)	38,078	32,752	14,290 (43.6%)
2013-2	N5	1,519	1,392	983 (70.6%)	37,313	31,922	18,248 (57.2%)
2014-1	N1	26,277	24,395	9,513 (39.0%)	73,782	64,409	21,108 (32.8%)
2014-1	N2	22,226	20,855	9,359 (44.9%)	73,829	64,699	29,313 (45.3%)
2014-1	N3	14,842	13,749	4,362 (31.7%)	42,746	35,251	15,535 (44.1%)
2014-1	N4	6,643	6,208	3,028 (48.8%)	27,271	22,944	10,657 (46.4%)
2014-1	N5	1,318	1,175	885 (75.3%)	23,154	19,658	10,726 (54.6%)
2014-2	N1	30,061	27,309	8,663 (31.7%)	76,516	66,610	20,260 (30.4%)
2014-2	N2	27,725	25,548	8,785 (34.4%)	73,274	63,494	25,361 (39.9%)
2014-2	N3	18,415	16,767	4,796 (28.6%)	51,365	42,642	17,189 (40.3%)
2014-2	N4	8,123	7,516	2,482 (33.0%)	40,292	34,265	13,142 (38.4%)
2014-2	N5	1,862	1,696	1,119 (66.0%)	42,172	35,492	17,002 (47.9%)
2015-1	N1	27,218	24,971	8,958 (35.9%)	70,453	60,642	20,625 (34.0%)
2015-1	N2	28,788	26,788	10,819 (40.4%)	74,931	64,764	28,538 (44.1%)
2015-1	N3	22,389	20,867	6,398 (30.7%)	46,799	38,489	16,081 (41.8%)
2015-1	N4	9,874	9,332	3,556 (38.1%)	32,597	27,241	9,383 (34.4%)
2015-1	N5	1,796	1,634	1,190 (72.8%)	29,201	24,569	12,940 (52.7%)
2015-2	N1	32,200	29,305	8,911 (30.4%)	74,059	64,355	17,768 (27.6%)
2015-2	N2	36,147	33,374	10,922 (32.7%)	76,202	65,804	26,408 (40.1%)
2015-2	N3	27,047	24,683	6,839 (27.7%)	55,103	45,589	19,739 (43.3%)
2015-2	N4	11,874	10,969	3,325 (30.3%)	45,623	38,566	14,794 (38.4%)
2015-2	N5	2,408	2,146	1,398 (65.1%)	45,543	38,431	19,203 (50.0%)
2016-1	N1	30,218	27,810	10,340 (37.2%)	69,147	59,790	19,396 (32.4%)
2016-1	N2	39,136	36,525	14,037 (38.4%)	79,208	68,642	32,324 (47.1%)
2016-1	N3	36,559	34,368	11,447 (33.3%)	50,857	41,816	19,531 (46.7%)
2016-1	N4	13,435	12,547	4,272 (34.0%)	36,637	30,498	11,960 (39.2%)
2016-1	N5	2,191	1,977	1,282 (64.8%)	32,286	27,106	13,671 (50.4%)
2016-2	N1	37,492	34,065	10,152 (29.8%)	74,584	64,866	20,041 (30.9%)
2016-2	N2	49,620	45,687	12,962 (28.4%)	86,649	74,949	29,862 (39.8%)
2016-2	N3	39,881	36,536	11,966 (32.8%)	63,187	52,404	23,389 (44.6%)
2016-2	N4	15,219	13,937	4,076 (29.2%)	52,626	44,393	15,444 (34.8%)
2016-2	N5	2,989	2,686	1,577 (58.7%)	54,373	45,200	21,515 (47.6%)
2017-1	N1	34,982	31,677	11,100 (35.0%)	74,034	63,021	20,861 (33.1%)
2017-1	N2	50,787	47,316	18,145 (38.3%)	94,523	80,933	38,216 (47.2%)
2017-1	N3	47,820	44,847	13,296 (29.6%)	62,494	50,635	22,560 (44.6%)
2017-1	N4	15,887	14,809	5,084 (34.3%)	43,995	36,193	14,135 (39.1%)
2017-1	N5	2,791	2,527	1,629 (64.5%)	39,094	32,148	17,180 (53.4%)
2017-2	N1	44,029	39,616	12,278 (31.0%)	80,973	69,322	22,010 (31.8%)
2017-2	N2	62,404	57,374	16,425 (28.6%)	101,151	86,145	34,593 (40.2%)
2017-2	N3	52,901	48,471	14,907 (30.8%)	74,761	60,855	26,432 (43.4%)
2017-2	N4	18,190	16,759	4,680 (27.9%)	61,986	51,643	18,504 (35.8%)
2017-2	N5	3,679	3,280	2,033 (62.0%)	60,630	49,809	23,972 (48.1%)
2018-1	N1	40,718	36,791	12,488 (33.9%)	80,896	68,235	22,494 (33.0%)
2018-1	N2	58,763	54,619	17,994 (32.9%)	105,171	89,320	37,326 (41.8%)
2018-1	N3	61,878	58,126	17,547 (30.2%)	71,951	58,417	26,691 (45.7%)
2018-1	N4	18,218	16,737	5,126 (30.6%)	51,353	42,468	14,412 (33.9%)
2018-1	N5	3,251	2,903	1,836 (63.2%)	51,990	42,463	20,768 (48.9%)
2018-2	N1	48,422	43,589	12,015 (27.6%)	83,808	71,416	21,509 (30.1%)
2018-2	N2	71,816	66,200	19,661 (29.7%)	110,457	94,099	37,523 (39.9%)
2018-2	N3	67,610	62,627	16,690 (26.6%)	79,761	64,907	28,027 (43.2%)
2018-2	N4	21,114	19,481	6,418 (32.9%)	68,296	57,009	20,345 (35.7%)
2018-2	N5	4,290	3,857	2,254 (58.4%)	68,237	55,810	24,913 (44.6%)
2019-1	N1	48,079	42,997	12,660 (29.4%)	87,919	73,863	21,575 (29.2%)
2019-1	N2	69,844	64,503	21,885 (33.9%)	118,683	99,931	37,275 (37.3%)
2019-1	N3	72,951	68,231	24,513 (35.9%)	84,794	68,019	29,153 (42.9%)
2019-1	N4	25,060	23,115	7,452 (32.2%)	69,925	56,616	18,613 (32.9%)
2019-1	N5	4,566	4,085	2,520 (61.7%)	62,283	49,088	22,797 (46.4%)
2019-2	N1	58,799	52,147	14,359 (27.5%)	89,689	75,681	24,953 (33.0%)
2019-2	N2	84,278	77,410	21,852 (28.2%)	118,327	100,630	41,958 (41.7%)
2019-2	N3	79,876	73,354	20,322 (27.7%)	86,307	70,540	28,033 (39.7%)
2019-2	N4	31,452	28,826	8,262 (28.7%)	89,443	74,677	23,055 (30.9%)
2019-2	N5	4,974	4,417	2,379 (53.9%)	74,918	60,405	24,784 (41.0%)
2020-2 (Note: Due to the COVID-19 pandemic, only the December test session was offered in 2020. The July test session was cancelled.)	N1	44,697	38,537	16,110 (41.8%)	46,704	41,700	20,160 (48.3%)
2020-2	N2	68,161	61,458	31,126 (50.6%)	59,956	52,618	32,685 (62.1%)
2020-2	N3	66,700	60,324	30,440 (50.5%)	45,592	37,884	22,709 (59.9%)
2020-2	N4	28,410	25,184	10,682 (42.4%)	34,192	27,809	12,427 (44.7%)
2020-2	N5	3,565	2,997	1,982 (66.1%)	26,170	21,517	11,749 (54.6%)
2021-1	N1	52,017	44,851	13,401 (29.9%)	58,688	50,324	24,115 (47.9%)
2021-1	N2	66,567	59,476	20,584 (34.6%)	60,047	51,095	27,597 (54.0%)
2021-1	N3	61,220	56,230	24,655 (43.8%)	27,481	20,953	12,463 (59.5%)
2021-1	N4	32,975	30,060	14,522 (48.3%)	13,975	11,014	6,030 (54.7%)
2021-1	N5	3,432	3,009	1,990 (66.1%)	10,969	8,903	6,052 (68.0%)
2021-2	N1	53,899	45,445	12,120 (26.7%)	53,893	44,091	18,806 (42.7%)
2021-2	N2	66,272	58,559	17,078 (29.2%)	53,365	42,839	25,001 (58.4%)
2021-2	N3	53,398	48,770	16,806 (34.5%)	44,420	33,513	20,413 (60.9%)
2021-2	N4	23,353	20,849	7,472 (35.8%)	35,803	27,662	13,601 (49.2%)
2021-2	N5	2,397	2,004	1,351 (67.4%)	33,410	25,260	15,638 (61.9%)
2022-1	N1	46,964	41,076	9,964 (24.3%)	59,348	49,223	17,282 (35.1%)
2022-1	N2	53,872	48,551	12,828 (26.4%)	67,023	54,542	25,677 (47.1%)
2022-1	N3	37,595	33,946	14,274 (42.0%)	52,735	41,264	21,058 (51.0%)
2022-1	N4	17,542	15,424	5,934 (38.5%)	50,508	40,120	19,389 (48.3%)
2022-1	N5	2,520	2,156	1,367 (63.4%)	38,118	30,203	16,132 (53.4%)
2022-2	N1	54,444	46,725	12,110 (25.9%)	41,535	33,793	12,672 (37.5%)
2022-2	N2	63,342	56,334	14,880 (26.4%)	49,951	40,785	17,251 (42.3%)
2022-2	N3	48,744	44,177	15,296 (34.6%)	57,737	46,560	22,408 (48.1%)
2022-2	N4	41,647	38,661	13,850 (35.8%)	81,176	68,878	29,948 (43.5%)
2022-2	N5	4,749	4,253	2,684 (63.1%)	62,968	51,283	23,583 (46.0%)

== Previous format (1984–2009) ==
Until 2009, the test had four levels. JLPT certificates do not expire, so results from the previous format remain valid.

All instructions on the test were written in Japanese, although their difficulty is adjusted to remain appropriate to each test level. The subject matter covered at each level of the examination was based upon the Test Content Specification (出題基準, Shutsudai kijun), first published in 1994 and revised in 2004. This specification served as a reference for examiners to compile test questions, rather than as a study guide for candidates. It consisted of kanji lists, expression lists, vocabulary lists, and grammar lists for all four JLPT levels. However, about 20% of the kanji, vocabulary, and grammar in any one exam may have been drawn from outside the prescribed lists at the discretion of exam compilers.

Test content summary
Level	Kanji	Vocabulary	Listening	Time of Study (est.)	Pass Mark
4	~100 (103)	~800 (728)	Basic	150 hrs (A basic course level)	60%
3	~300 (284)	~1,500 (1409)	Intermediate	300 hrs (An intermediate course level)	60%
2	~1000 (1023)	~6,000 (5035)	Intermediate	600 hrs (An intermediate course level)	60%
1	~2000 (1926)	~10,000 (8009)	Advanced	900 hrs (An advanced course level)	70%

Numbers in parentheses indicate the exact number in the Test Content Specification.

The independent source the Japanese Language Education Center publishes the following study hour comparison data:

JLPT Study Hour Comparison Data 1992-2010
Level	Students with kanji knowledge (e.g. speakers of Chinese)	Other students (no prior kanji knowledge)
4	200~300 hours	250~400 hours
3	375~475 hours	500~750 hours
2	1100~1500 hours	1400~2000 hours
1	1800~2300 hours	3100~4500 hours

=== Test sections ===
In its previous format, the JLPT was divided into three sections: "Characters and Vocabulary" (100 points), "Listening Comprehension" (100 points), and "Reading Comprehension and Grammar" (200 points).

The first section (文字･語彙, moji, goi) tests knowledge of vocabulary and various aspects of the Japanese writing system. This includes identifying the correct kanji characters for given situations, selecting the correct hiragana readings for given kanji, choosing the appropriate terms for given sentences, and choosing the appropriate usage of given words.

The second section (聴解, chōkai) comprises two sub-sections that test listening comprehension. The first involves choosing the picture which best represents the situation presented by a prerecorded conversation. The second is of a similar format but presents no visual clues.

Section three (読解･文法, dokkai, bunpō) uses authentic or semi-authentic reading passages of various lengths to test reading comprehension. Questions include prompts to fill in blank parts of the text and requests to paraphrase key points. Grammar questions request that examinees select the correct grammar structure to convey a given point or test conjugations and postpositional particle agreement.

Exam duration
Level	Kanji and vocabulary	Listening comprehension	Reading comprehension and grammar	Total duration
4	25 min	25 min	50 min	100 min
3	35 min	35 min	70 min	140 min
2	35 min	40 min	70 min	145 min
1	45 min	45 min	90 min	180 min

=== Comparison with new format ===
Two changes in levels of tests were made from the previous four-level format: firstly, a new level was inserted between the old level 3 and level 2, and secondly, the content of the top level exam (old level 1) was changed to test slightly more advanced skills, though the passing level was not changed, possibly through equating of test scores. Vocabulary in particular is said to be taken from an increased pool of 18,000 words.

The addition of the new N3 was done to address the problem of the difficulty gap between levels 3 and 2: in the past, there had been requests for revisions to address the fact that examinees who had passed the Level 3 test often had trouble with passing the Level 2 test because of the large gap in the level of skill needed to pass those two levels. There was also a desire to measure abilities more advanced than those targeted by the current Level 1 test, hence the top-level exam was modified.

The correspondence is as follows:

- N1: slightly more advanced than the original level 1, but the same passing level
- N2: the same as the original level 2
- N3: in between the original level 2 and level 3
- N4: the same as the original level 3
- N5: the same as the original level 4

The revised test continues to test the same content categories as the original, but the first and third sections of the test have been combined into a single section. Sections on oral and writing skills were not introduced. Further, a requirement to pass individual sections was added, rather than only achieving an overall score.

It has been argued that changes to the exam were connected to the introduction of new language policies instituted by the Ministry of Education regarding the education of minorities in Japan.

== See also ==
- List of language proficiency tests
- Business Japanese Proficiency Test
- J-Test
- Kanji kentei
- Nihongo Kentei
