= Certification of Italian as a Foreign Language =

Qualification offered by the Foreigners University of Siena, Italy

The Certification of Italian as a Foreign Language (Certificazione di Italiano come Lingua Straniera or CILS) is a qualification offered by the Foreigners University of Siena for foreign speakers of the Italian language, recognizing various levels of language proficiency. The qualification is recognized by the Italian Ministry of Foreign Affairs and is often used to grant acceptance in any Italian university or higher education institution in Italy.

== Origins ==
The origins of the modern CILS qualification are said to date back to 1588 when the Grand Duke of Tuscany Ferdinand I created a school for learning of the then Tuscan Italian language for German students. Subsequent movements for the dissemination of the Italian language and Italian culture have also been established and promoted throughout history. The Foreigners University of Siena embodies the role nowadays for the official creation, distribution, and awarding of the CILS qualification.

== Structure ==
The qualification is officially issued on successful completion of a particular level, conforming with the Common European Framework of Reference for Languages of the European Council. Therefore six levels of increasing difficulty are represented by the examinations involved to obtain the certificate. The beginner level examination starts at level A1 whilst the most advanced level is C2. As such the qualification resembles the DELF/DALF used for recognizing French language ability. This said, however, the qualification is often seen as comprising four levels (from CILS Uno to CILS Quattro, B1 to C2 according to the European Framework) as the Italian required becomes more advanced. All examinations cover what are viewed as the most important elements in language acquisition: speaking, reading, written composition, analysis of structures of communication, and listening.

== Levels ==
CILS Uno The first (B1) of the more advanced levels requires the passing of a three-hour-long examination, testing an applicant's knowledge of basic Italian.

CILS Due The second level (B2) features a four-hour-long examination with an advancement of difficulty. This level is considered as recognizing an applicant's sustained ability to adequately converse in Italian and is the level from which one may apply for entrance to an Italian university without sitting the normally obligatory language assessment.

CILS Tre The third level (C1) is again another advancement in difficulty and represents a high competence in speaking Italian. An applicant must pass a five-hour-long examination to receive this level of qualification.

CILS Quattro The fourth level (C2) is the highest level of the CILS qualifications. Upon successful completion of the five-and-a-half-hour-long examination of this level an applicant is regarded as having reached a point of language mastery, almost akin to that of a native.

== Eligibility ==
CILS qualification is open to all Italian residents abroad and non-Italian speakers wishing to validate their skills in Italian. Applicants of any age are eligible to apply. Preparation for the examination is highly encouraged.

== Procedure ==
To sit the examination, applicants must pay for registration (prices varying between countries) and then sit it at any certified examination centre. When an exam has been completed, the University for Foreigners of Siena evaluates the result, following the guidelines of the European Union, awarding the appropriate level of qualification when an applicant scores the required minimum pass mark or above. The examinations traditionally take place in June and December of every year.

Many centres around the world, including the University for Foreigners of Siena, organize preparatory lessons and guides to best prepare students for the rigours of the exams.

== See also ==
- CELI
- PLIDA
