= Business Japanese Proficiency Test =

Japanese language proficiency test

- Acronym: BJT
- Type: Computer-based language test
- Administrator: Japan Kanji Aptitude Testing Public Interest Foundation (since 2009); Japan External Trade Organization (formerly)
- Skills tested: Japanese language proficiency for business communication
- Year started: 1996
- Duration: 1 hour 45 minutes
- Score range: 0 to 800
- Regions: Over 16 countries
- Website: www.kanken.or.jp/bjt/english/

The Business Japanese Proficiency Test (BJT) (ビジネス日本語能力テスト, Bijinesu Nihongo Nōryoku Tesuto) is a Japanese language proficiency test designed to objectively measure a person's practical communicative skills in communicating and responding to information in a Japanese-language business environment. Unlike its counterpart Japanese Language Proficiency Test (JLPT) which focuses more on general Japanese, BJT is not designed for measuring Japanese language knowledge nor business knowledge but instead, BJT is designed to measure a person's practical communicative ability to utilize and respond to given information, ability to express thoughts and opinions, and at the same time promote ideas or projects to people of different backgrounds and expertise.

The BJT is not only engineered to measure a person's verbal communicative skills, but also the ability to understand and use Japanese with the aid of text, diagrams, photographs and any other available information in emails or faxes, etc. and at the same time to appropriately perform tasks and workloads suited to a Japanese-language business environment.

The Business Japanese Proficiency Test covers the full range of events or situations that may arise on a Japanese-language business environment.

== History ==
The test was first offered in 1996 and was revised in 2003. It was originally administered by the Japan External Trade Organization (JETRO). In April 2009, however, oversight was transferred to the Japan Kanji Aptitude Testing Public Interest Foundation: the same organization that administers the Kanji kentei.

On August 18, 2010, it was announced that the test would "be discontinued at the end of the current fiscal year". However, on November 25, 2010, it was announced that the test would be "relaunched".

== Examination and scoring ==
The Business Japanese Proficiency Test is split into three parts, Listening Comprehension, Listening and Reading Comprehension and Reading Comprehension.

Exam Overview	Duration	Questions		
Listening Comprehension Section	Approx. 45 minutes	Situational Understanding 5 questions	Conversational Listening Comprehension 10 questions	General Listening Comprehension 10 questions
Listening and Reading Comprehension Section	Approx. 30 minutes	Situational Understanding 5 questions	Information Listening and Reading 10 questions	General Listening and Reading 10 questions
Reading Comprehension Section	Approx. 30 minutes	Vocabulary / Grammar 10 questions	Expression Reading and Comprehension 10 questions	General Reading Comprehension 10 questions

- Exam overview as stated on the official BJT website.

The test is scored out of a possible 800. The score is then ranked on a scale of 6 levels: J5, J4, J3, J2, J1, J1+, with J1+ being the highest and J5 the lowest.

Evaluation Level Guideline		Points
J1+	Has the ability to adequately communicate in a Japanese-language business environment in any situation	600 - 800
J1	Has the ability to suitably communicate in a Japanese-language business environment in a wide range of situations	530 - 600
J2	Has the ability to suitably communicate in a Japanese-language business environment in a limited range of situations	420 - 530
J3	Is able to achieve a limited degree of communication in a Japanese-language business environment in a limited range of situations	320 - 420
J4	Is able to achieve a nominal degree of communication in a Japanese-language business environment in a limited range of situations	200 - 320
J5	Has no ability to communicate in a Japanese-language business environment	0 - 200

*Level guideline as described on the BJT website

== Testing locations ==
Starting April 2017, the BJT is now being delivered as a computer based test via the Pearson Vue delivery system, a radical change from the industry standard paper based testing.

As of 2018, the BJT is now available in more than 16 countries via the Pearson Vue testing network.

	Test Center Locations
Japan	Sapporo, Sendai, Koriyama, Tokyo, Chiba, Yokohama, Niigata, Hamamatsu, Nagoya, Kyoto, Osaka, Kobe, Okayama, Hiroshima, Matsuyama, Kitakyushu, Fukuoka, Oita, Naha
Brazil	São Paulo
China	Beijing, Shanghai, Guangzhou, Dalian, Qingdao, Tianjin, Shenyang, Nanjing, Chengdu, Hangzhou, Suzhou, Shenzhen, Xi'an, Wuhan
France	Paris
Germany	Düsseldorf
Hong Kong	Hong Kong
India	New Delhi, Chennai
Indonesia	Jakarta
Italy	Padova (temporarily closed as of 2021)
Malaysia	Kuala Lumpur
Mexico	Mexico City
Myanmar	Yangon
Singapore	Singapore
South Korea	Seoul, Busan
Taiwan	Taipei, Taichung, Kaohsiung
Thailand	Bangkok
United Kingdom	London
United States of America	Los Angeles, New York, Chicago
Vietnam	Hanoi, Ho Chi Minh, Da Nang

*Test center locations available on the Pearson Vue website
