= J-Test =

Japanese language proficiency test

The J-Test was introduced in 1991 as a method for the objective measurement of Japanese language proficiency of non-native speakers. Broadly based on the format of a listening test, the exam attempts to gauge practical proficiency in Japanese.

== Test times ==
The test is held six times a year in January, March, May, July, September and November at sites throughout Japan, People's Republic of China, Republic of China (Taiwan), South Korea, Thailand, Mongolia, Vietnam, Myanmar, Nepal, Indonesia and Philippines.

== Format ==
J-Test consists of three parts:

1. Listening Comprehension
2. Reading Comprehension
3. Writing section

=== Listening Comprehension ===
In Listening Comprehension the examiners play an audio clip comprising the following sections:

1. See the picture and listen to the questions and answer them.
2. Listen to the conversation and answer the question.
3. Listen to the scene which is played in the audio clip and answer the questions.
4. The audio file will give a list of words and candidates have to select one which is similar to a given word.

=== Reading ===
In the Reading section candidates are given different paragraphs to read, about which questions are asked.

=== Writing ===
The Writing section includes questions based on the following template:

1. Identify a Kanji's Hiragana reading.
2. For a given hiragana word, identify the kanji.
3. Write the hiragana reading for a given kanji.
  e.g. "For 人口, the hiragana reading is じんこう."
4. Complete the sentence.
  e.g. "もし_______タラ______です"
5. Constructing a sentence based on three given words.
  e.g. "Make a sentence with Aruku, Iku, Ichiban."

== See also ==
- Chinese character
- Japanese Language Proficiency Test
- Kanji Kentei
