= PLIDA =

Italian language diploma

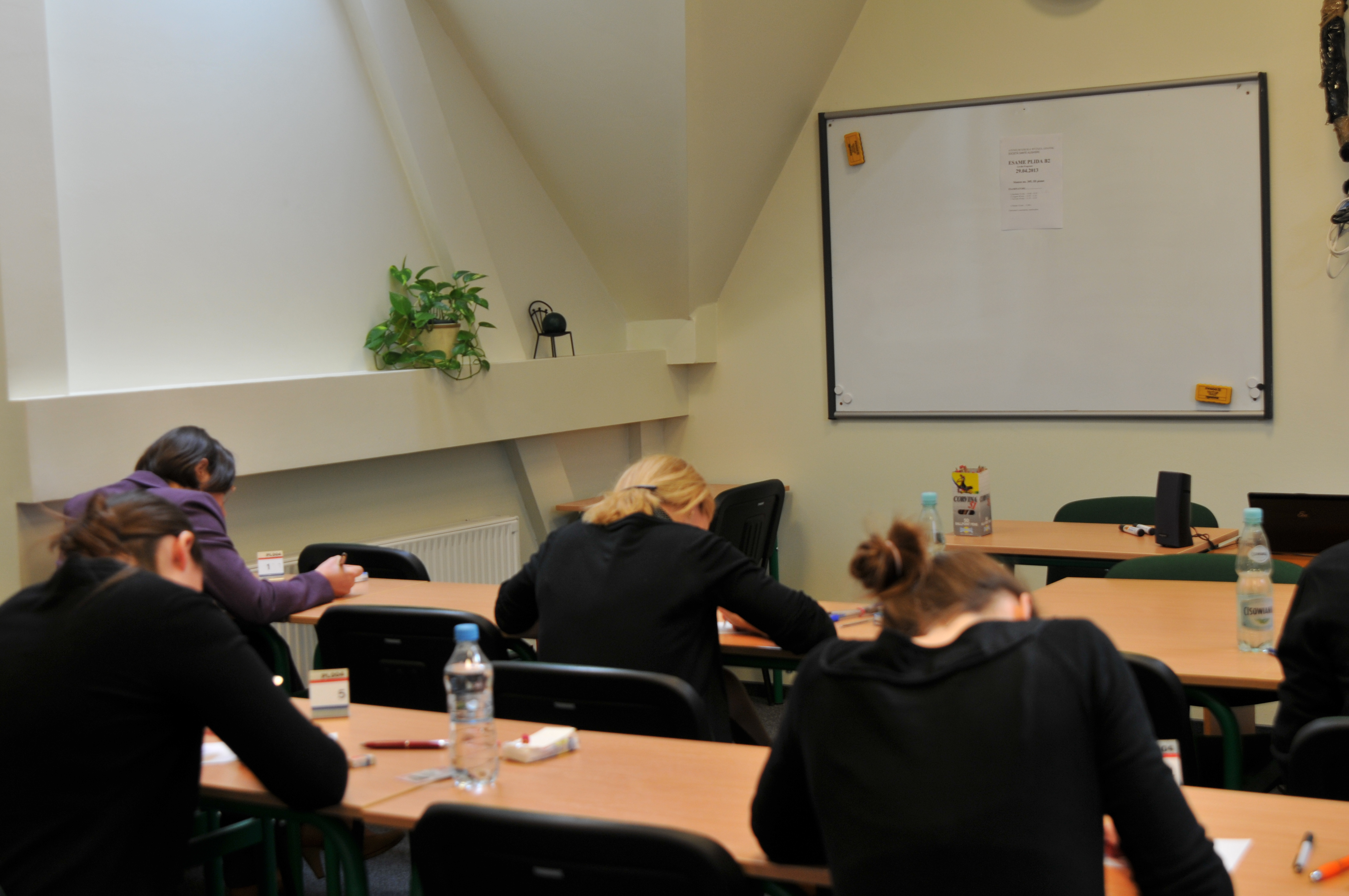
Students taking a PLIDA exam, 2013

PLIDA, or Progetto Lingua Italiana Dante Alighieri (Dante Alighieri Society Diplomas), are language diplomas issued by Dante Alighieri Society certifying the holder's proficiency in Italian language as a foreign language. The diplomas could only be obtained after passing a standardised language test. The Rome Branch of the Dante Alighieri Society is the official centre of examination for the issuing of PLIDA Certification.

== Recognition ==
The PLIDA certificate is officially recognised by the Ministry of Foreign Affairs, the Ministry of Labour and Welfare and the Ministry of Education, University and Research of Italy.

According to the Decree of the Ministry of the Interior of 4 June 2010, any foreigners should be able to demonstrate proficiency in the Italian language, if they want to obtain the long-term residence permit. Holders of A2 PLIDA certificate could be exempted from the test held by the Prefectures.

With the certificate (B2 or C1 level, depending on university and subject), students can be enrolled into universities or schools without taking the mandatory Italian language examinations.

== Eligibility ==
PLIDA tests can be taken only by those who are not native speakers of Italian. All candidates can take the test at the level they prefer, and it is not a pre-requisite that they have passed the tests at lower levels.

== Test ==
The Dante Alighieri Society is the organiser of PLIDA tests, with the academic approval from the Sapienza University of Rome. The Certification test is designed on the principles of the communicative approach, based on real-life tasks so as to test the ability in four areas: listening, reading, writing and speaking. The examination lasts for a minimum of 100 minutes to a maximum of 190 minutes, depending on the level.

There are tests of six levels, A1 to C2, set according to the levels in the Common European Framework of Reference for Languages.

- A1: the ability to use familiar everyday expressions aimed at the satisfaction of needs of a concrete type and to ask and answer questions about personal details. At this level of competence, interaction with Italian speakers can take place provided the other person is prepared to help.
- A2: the ability to communicate in simple and routine tasks requiring a simple and direct exchange of information on areas of most immediate relevance, such as personal and family description, shopping, local geography and employment.
- B1: the ability to understand written and spoken texts on familiar matters. At this level, one is able to engage effectively in a conversation as a tourist, to express opinions and to give simple explanations.
- B2: the competence in the language which is necessary in a traditional scholastic context (to register with school or universities), to pursue post-graduate learning (such as professional and training courses), as well as to prepare for work activities that involve interaction with the public. At this level, one can interact with Italian speakers fluently and spontaneously and use the language for work related activities in one’s own field.
- C1: a strong confidence with the Italian language and culture, such that it can be used in all working environments (professional, commercial, industrial and administrative). One can understand and produce a wide range of demanding, longer texts and recognise implicit meanings in complex writings such as literary works.
- C2: a high linguistic competence comparable to that possessed by an Italian cultured speaker and applicable in any and all professional settings. It is the level required to teach Italian as a foreign language and to qualify for professional assignments of a high degree.

== Results ==
Tests are marked in terms of a maximum of thirty points. To pass the examination, the candidate has to obtain a minimum of 18/30 in every tested areas, namely, listening, reading, writing and speaking. A candidate who passes at least three of the four areas obtains a credit in the areas passed, and these three credits may be used in the next attempt in the failed area.

== See also ==
- CELI
- Certification of Italian as a Foreign Language (CILS)
